

301001–301100 

|-bgcolor=#d6d6d6
| 301001 ||  || — || April 6, 2008 || Mount Lemmon || Mount Lemmon Survey || — || align=right | 4.4 km || 
|-id=002 bgcolor=#C2FFFF
| 301002 ||  || — || April 8, 2008 || Kitt Peak || Spacewatch || L5 || align=right | 13 km || 
|-id=003 bgcolor=#E9E9E9
| 301003 ||  || — || April 9, 2008 || Mount Lemmon || Mount Lemmon Survey || — || align=right | 2.6 km || 
|-id=004 bgcolor=#d6d6d6
| 301004 ||  || — || April 11, 2008 || Kitt Peak || Spacewatch || TIR || align=right | 3.8 km || 
|-id=005 bgcolor=#C2FFFF
| 301005 ||  || — || April 11, 2008 || Kitt Peak || Spacewatch || L5 || align=right | 11 km || 
|-id=006 bgcolor=#d6d6d6
| 301006 ||  || — || April 12, 2008 || Catalina || CSS || EUP || align=right | 6.5 km || 
|-id=007 bgcolor=#C2FFFF
| 301007 ||  || — || April 7, 2008 || Kitt Peak || Spacewatch || L5 || align=right | 9.6 km || 
|-id=008 bgcolor=#C2FFFF
| 301008 ||  || — || April 14, 2008 || Kitt Peak || Spacewatch || L5 || align=right | 8.7 km || 
|-id=009 bgcolor=#C2FFFF
| 301009 ||  || — || April 7, 2008 || Kitt Peak || Spacewatch || L5 || align=right | 8.3 km || 
|-id=010 bgcolor=#C2FFFF
| 301010 ||  || — || April 30, 2008 || Kitt Peak || Spacewatch || L5ENM || align=right | 12 km || 
|-id=011 bgcolor=#FFC2E0
| 301011 ||  || — || May 2, 2008 || Catalina || CSS || APO || align=right data-sort-value="0.73" | 730 m || 
|-id=012 bgcolor=#C2FFFF
| 301012 ||  || — || May 3, 2008 || Mount Lemmon || Mount Lemmon Survey || L5 || align=right | 9.3 km || 
|-id=013 bgcolor=#C2FFFF
| 301013 ||  || — || May 4, 2008 || Kitt Peak || Spacewatch || L5 || align=right | 12 km || 
|-id=014 bgcolor=#E9E9E9
| 301014 ||  || — || July 27, 2005 || Palomar || NEAT || — || align=right | 1.6 km || 
|-id=015 bgcolor=#fefefe
| 301015 ||  || — || August 12, 2008 || La Sagra || OAM Obs. || H || align=right data-sort-value="0.89" | 890 m || 
|-id=016 bgcolor=#fefefe
| 301016 ||  || — || August 30, 2008 || Socorro || LINEAR || — || align=right | 1.0 km || 
|-id=017 bgcolor=#fefefe
| 301017 ||  || — || September 7, 2008 || Mount Lemmon || Mount Lemmon Survey || — || align=right data-sort-value="0.59" | 590 m || 
|-id=018 bgcolor=#C2FFFF
| 301018 ||  || — || September 3, 2008 || Kitt Peak || Spacewatch || L4 || align=right | 11 km || 
|-id=019 bgcolor=#fefefe
| 301019 ||  || — || September 7, 2008 || Mount Lemmon || Mount Lemmon Survey || — || align=right data-sort-value="0.45" | 450 m || 
|-id=020 bgcolor=#E9E9E9
| 301020 ||  || — || September 4, 2008 || Kitt Peak || Spacewatch || — || align=right | 3.3 km || 
|-id=021 bgcolor=#fefefe
| 301021 Sofiarodriguez ||  ||  || September 23, 2008 || Wrightwood || J. W. Young || — || align=right data-sort-value="0.89" | 890 m || 
|-id=022 bgcolor=#fefefe
| 301022 ||  || — || September 19, 2008 || Kitt Peak || Spacewatch || FLO || align=right data-sort-value="0.50" | 500 m || 
|-id=023 bgcolor=#fefefe
| 301023 ||  || — || September 21, 2008 || Junk Bond || D. Healy || — || align=right data-sort-value="0.67" | 670 m || 
|-id=024 bgcolor=#fefefe
| 301024 ||  || — || September 23, 2008 || Catalina || CSS || FLO || align=right data-sort-value="0.66" | 660 m || 
|-id=025 bgcolor=#fefefe
| 301025 ||  || — || September 21, 2008 || Kitt Peak || Spacewatch || — || align=right data-sort-value="0.81" | 810 m || 
|-id=026 bgcolor=#fefefe
| 301026 ||  || — || September 21, 2008 || Kitt Peak || Spacewatch || — || align=right data-sort-value="0.80" | 800 m || 
|-id=027 bgcolor=#fefefe
| 301027 ||  || — || September 22, 2008 || Kitt Peak || Spacewatch || — || align=right data-sort-value="0.72" | 720 m || 
|-id=028 bgcolor=#fefefe
| 301028 ||  || — || September 25, 2008 || Kitt Peak || Spacewatch || — || align=right data-sort-value="0.65" | 650 m || 
|-id=029 bgcolor=#fefefe
| 301029 ||  || — || September 26, 2008 || Kitt Peak || Spacewatch || — || align=right data-sort-value="0.85" | 850 m || 
|-id=030 bgcolor=#fefefe
| 301030 ||  || — || September 26, 2008 || Kitt Peak || Spacewatch || NYS || align=right data-sort-value="0.84" | 840 m || 
|-id=031 bgcolor=#fefefe
| 301031 ||  || — || September 29, 2008 || Kitt Peak || Spacewatch || — || align=right data-sort-value="0.90" | 900 m || 
|-id=032 bgcolor=#fefefe
| 301032 ||  || — || September 22, 2008 || Mount Lemmon || Mount Lemmon Survey || — || align=right data-sort-value="0.80" | 800 m || 
|-id=033 bgcolor=#fefefe
| 301033 ||  || — || September 29, 2008 || Kitt Peak || Spacewatch || — || align=right data-sort-value="0.81" | 810 m || 
|-id=034 bgcolor=#fefefe
| 301034 ||  || — || September 20, 2008 || Kitt Peak || Spacewatch || — || align=right data-sort-value="0.72" | 720 m || 
|-id=035 bgcolor=#fefefe
| 301035 ||  || — || September 24, 2008 || Kitt Peak || Spacewatch || FLO || align=right data-sort-value="0.70" | 700 m || 
|-id=036 bgcolor=#fefefe
| 301036 ||  || — || September 22, 2008 || Mount Lemmon || Mount Lemmon Survey || FLO || align=right data-sort-value="0.77" | 770 m || 
|-id=037 bgcolor=#C2FFFF
| 301037 ||  || — || September 22, 2008 || Catalina || CSS || L4 || align=right | 11 km || 
|-id=038 bgcolor=#fefefe
| 301038 ||  || — || September 20, 2008 || Kitt Peak || Spacewatch || FLO || align=right data-sort-value="0.72" | 720 m || 
|-id=039 bgcolor=#fefefe
| 301039 ||  || — || September 27, 2008 || Mount Lemmon || Mount Lemmon Survey || FLO || align=right data-sort-value="0.64" | 640 m || 
|-id=040 bgcolor=#fefefe
| 301040 ||  || — || October 1, 2008 || Mount Lemmon || Mount Lemmon Survey || — || align=right data-sort-value="0.59" | 590 m || 
|-id=041 bgcolor=#fefefe
| 301041 ||  || — || October 1, 2008 || Kitt Peak || Spacewatch || — || align=right data-sort-value="0.73" | 730 m || 
|-id=042 bgcolor=#fefefe
| 301042 ||  || — || October 1, 2008 || Kitt Peak || Spacewatch || FLO || align=right data-sort-value="0.46" | 460 m || 
|-id=043 bgcolor=#fefefe
| 301043 ||  || — || October 2, 2008 || Kitt Peak || Spacewatch || — || align=right data-sort-value="0.58" | 580 m || 
|-id=044 bgcolor=#fefefe
| 301044 ||  || — || October 2, 2008 || Catalina || CSS || — || align=right | 1.00 km || 
|-id=045 bgcolor=#fefefe
| 301045 ||  || — || October 6, 2008 || Kitt Peak || Spacewatch || V || align=right data-sort-value="0.59" | 590 m || 
|-id=046 bgcolor=#fefefe
| 301046 ||  || — || October 6, 2008 || Kitt Peak || Spacewatch || — || align=right data-sort-value="0.82" | 820 m || 
|-id=047 bgcolor=#fefefe
| 301047 ||  || — || December 8, 2005 || Kitt Peak || Spacewatch || — || align=right data-sort-value="0.73" | 730 m || 
|-id=048 bgcolor=#fefefe
| 301048 ||  || — || October 9, 2008 || Kitt Peak || Spacewatch || FLO || align=right data-sort-value="0.67" | 670 m || 
|-id=049 bgcolor=#fefefe
| 301049 ||  || — || October 2, 2008 || Mount Lemmon || Mount Lemmon Survey || — || align=right data-sort-value="0.80" | 800 m || 
|-id=050 bgcolor=#fefefe
| 301050 ||  || — || October 8, 2008 || Catalina || CSS || FLO || align=right data-sort-value="0.76" | 760 m || 
|-id=051 bgcolor=#fefefe
| 301051 ||  || — || October 2, 2008 || Catalina || CSS || — || align=right data-sort-value="0.99" | 990 m || 
|-id=052 bgcolor=#fefefe
| 301052 ||  || — || October 9, 2008 || Kitt Peak || Spacewatch || — || align=right data-sort-value="0.80" | 800 m || 
|-id=053 bgcolor=#fefefe
| 301053 ||  || — || October 22, 2008 || Junk Bond || D. Healy || — || align=right data-sort-value="0.82" | 820 m || 
|-id=054 bgcolor=#fefefe
| 301054 ||  || — || October 17, 2008 || Kitt Peak || Spacewatch || V || align=right data-sort-value="0.67" | 670 m || 
|-id=055 bgcolor=#fefefe
| 301055 ||  || — || October 20, 2008 || Kitt Peak || Spacewatch || — || align=right data-sort-value="0.69" | 690 m || 
|-id=056 bgcolor=#fefefe
| 301056 ||  || — || October 20, 2008 || Kitt Peak || Spacewatch || — || align=right data-sort-value="0.71" | 710 m || 
|-id=057 bgcolor=#fefefe
| 301057 ||  || — || October 20, 2008 || Mount Lemmon || Mount Lemmon Survey || NYS || align=right data-sort-value="0.72" | 720 m || 
|-id=058 bgcolor=#fefefe
| 301058 ||  || — || October 21, 2008 || Kitt Peak || Spacewatch || — || align=right data-sort-value="0.81" | 810 m || 
|-id=059 bgcolor=#fefefe
| 301059 ||  || — || October 21, 2008 || Kitt Peak || Spacewatch || V || align=right data-sort-value="0.99" | 990 m || 
|-id=060 bgcolor=#fefefe
| 301060 ||  || — || October 22, 2008 || Mount Lemmon || Mount Lemmon Survey || — || align=right data-sort-value="0.71" | 710 m || 
|-id=061 bgcolor=#fefefe
| 301061 Egelsbach ||  ||  || October 28, 2008 || Tzec Maun || E. Schwab || — || align=right data-sort-value="0.66" | 660 m || 
|-id=062 bgcolor=#fefefe
| 301062 ||  || — || October 20, 2008 || Kitt Peak || Spacewatch || V || align=right data-sort-value="0.60" | 600 m || 
|-id=063 bgcolor=#fefefe
| 301063 ||  || — || October 22, 2008 || Kitt Peak || Spacewatch || FLO || align=right data-sort-value="0.72" | 720 m || 
|-id=064 bgcolor=#fefefe
| 301064 ||  || — || October 22, 2008 || Kitt Peak || Spacewatch || — || align=right | 1.1 km || 
|-id=065 bgcolor=#fefefe
| 301065 ||  || — || October 22, 2008 || Kitt Peak || Spacewatch || V || align=right data-sort-value="0.84" | 840 m || 
|-id=066 bgcolor=#fefefe
| 301066 ||  || — || October 23, 2008 || Kitt Peak || Spacewatch || — || align=right data-sort-value="0.85" | 850 m || 
|-id=067 bgcolor=#fefefe
| 301067 ||  || — || October 23, 2008 || Kitt Peak || Spacewatch || — || align=right data-sort-value="0.57" | 570 m || 
|-id=068 bgcolor=#fefefe
| 301068 ||  || — || October 23, 2008 || Kitt Peak || Spacewatch || — || align=right data-sort-value="0.70" | 700 m || 
|-id=069 bgcolor=#fefefe
| 301069 ||  || — || October 24, 2008 || Kitt Peak || Spacewatch || — || align=right data-sort-value="0.81" | 810 m || 
|-id=070 bgcolor=#fefefe
| 301070 ||  || — || October 24, 2008 || Catalina || CSS || — || align=right | 1.0 km || 
|-id=071 bgcolor=#fefefe
| 301071 ||  || — || October 24, 2008 || Kitt Peak || Spacewatch || — || align=right data-sort-value="0.64" | 640 m || 
|-id=072 bgcolor=#fefefe
| 301072 ||  || — || October 25, 2008 || Mount Lemmon || Mount Lemmon Survey || — || align=right data-sort-value="0.73" | 730 m || 
|-id=073 bgcolor=#fefefe
| 301073 ||  || — || October 27, 2008 || Socorro || LINEAR || — || align=right data-sort-value="0.93" | 930 m || 
|-id=074 bgcolor=#fefefe
| 301074 ||  || — || October 23, 2008 || Kitt Peak || Spacewatch || — || align=right data-sort-value="0.83" | 830 m || 
|-id=075 bgcolor=#fefefe
| 301075 ||  || — || October 23, 2008 || Kitt Peak || Spacewatch || — || align=right | 1.2 km || 
|-id=076 bgcolor=#fefefe
| 301076 ||  || — || October 25, 2008 || Kitt Peak || Spacewatch || — || align=right | 1.6 km || 
|-id=077 bgcolor=#fefefe
| 301077 ||  || — || December 27, 2005 || Kitt Peak || Spacewatch || — || align=right data-sort-value="0.90" | 900 m || 
|-id=078 bgcolor=#fefefe
| 301078 ||  || — || October 26, 2008 || Kitt Peak || Spacewatch || — || align=right data-sort-value="0.99" | 990 m || 
|-id=079 bgcolor=#fefefe
| 301079 ||  || — || November 15, 1998 || Kitt Peak || Spacewatch || — || align=right data-sort-value="0.83" | 830 m || 
|-id=080 bgcolor=#fefefe
| 301080 ||  || — || October 27, 2008 || Kitt Peak || Spacewatch || — || align=right data-sort-value="0.66" | 660 m || 
|-id=081 bgcolor=#fefefe
| 301081 ||  || — || December 2, 2005 || Mount Lemmon || Mount Lemmon Survey || FLO || align=right data-sort-value="0.75" | 750 m || 
|-id=082 bgcolor=#fefefe
| 301082 ||  || — || October 28, 2008 || Kitt Peak || Spacewatch || — || align=right data-sort-value="0.97" | 970 m || 
|-id=083 bgcolor=#fefefe
| 301083 ||  || — || October 28, 2008 || Mount Lemmon || Mount Lemmon Survey || — || align=right data-sort-value="0.53" | 530 m || 
|-id=084 bgcolor=#fefefe
| 301084 ||  || — || October 29, 2008 || Kitt Peak || Spacewatch || V || align=right data-sort-value="0.57" | 570 m || 
|-id=085 bgcolor=#fefefe
| 301085 ||  || — || October 30, 2008 || Catalina || CSS || — || align=right data-sort-value="0.83" | 830 m || 
|-id=086 bgcolor=#fefefe
| 301086 ||  || — || October 30, 2008 || Kitt Peak || Spacewatch || — || align=right data-sort-value="0.73" | 730 m || 
|-id=087 bgcolor=#fefefe
| 301087 ||  || — || October 21, 2008 || Kitt Peak || Spacewatch || — || align=right data-sort-value="0.75" | 750 m || 
|-id=088 bgcolor=#fefefe
| 301088 ||  || — || October 23, 2008 || Kitt Peak || Spacewatch || V || align=right data-sort-value="0.68" | 680 m || 
|-id=089 bgcolor=#fefefe
| 301089 ||  || — || October 23, 2008 || Mount Lemmon || Mount Lemmon Survey || NYS || align=right data-sort-value="0.59" | 590 m || 
|-id=090 bgcolor=#fefefe
| 301090 ||  || — || October 27, 2008 || Kitt Peak || Spacewatch || FLO || align=right data-sort-value="0.59" | 590 m || 
|-id=091 bgcolor=#fefefe
| 301091 ||  || — || October 31, 2008 || Kitt Peak || Spacewatch || NYS || align=right | 2.3 km || 
|-id=092 bgcolor=#fefefe
| 301092 ||  || — || October 31, 2008 || Kitt Peak || Spacewatch || — || align=right data-sort-value="0.74" | 740 m || 
|-id=093 bgcolor=#fefefe
| 301093 ||  || — || October 25, 2008 || Mount Lemmon || Mount Lemmon Survey || V || align=right data-sort-value="0.76" | 760 m || 
|-id=094 bgcolor=#fefefe
| 301094 ||  || — || October 30, 2008 || Kitt Peak || Spacewatch || — || align=right data-sort-value="0.73" | 730 m || 
|-id=095 bgcolor=#fefefe
| 301095 ||  || — || October 25, 2008 || Kitt Peak || Spacewatch || ERI || align=right | 1.7 km || 
|-id=096 bgcolor=#E9E9E9
| 301096 ||  || — || October 25, 2008 || Kitt Peak || Spacewatch || EUN || align=right | 1.6 km || 
|-id=097 bgcolor=#fefefe
| 301097 ||  || — || October 27, 2008 || Kitt Peak || Spacewatch || — || align=right data-sort-value="0.82" | 820 m || 
|-id=098 bgcolor=#fefefe
| 301098 ||  || — || October 25, 2008 || Catalina || CSS || — || align=right data-sort-value="0.80" | 800 m || 
|-id=099 bgcolor=#fefefe
| 301099 ||  || — || October 27, 2008 || Mount Lemmon || Mount Lemmon Survey || — || align=right data-sort-value="0.87" | 870 m || 
|-id=100 bgcolor=#fefefe
| 301100 ||  || — || October 27, 2008 || Mount Lemmon || Mount Lemmon Survey || FLO || align=right data-sort-value="0.76" | 760 m || 
|}

301101–301200 

|-bgcolor=#E9E9E9
| 301101 ||  || — || October 28, 2008 || Mount Lemmon || Mount Lemmon Survey || EUN || align=right | 1.7 km || 
|-id=102 bgcolor=#fefefe
| 301102 ||  || — || November 1, 2008 || Kitt Peak || Spacewatch || FLO || align=right data-sort-value="0.70" | 700 m || 
|-id=103 bgcolor=#fefefe
| 301103 ||  || — || November 2, 2008 || Kitt Peak || Spacewatch || — || align=right | 1.1 km || 
|-id=104 bgcolor=#fefefe
| 301104 ||  || — || November 3, 2008 || Kitt Peak || Spacewatch || — || align=right | 1.1 km || 
|-id=105 bgcolor=#fefefe
| 301105 ||  || — || November 7, 2008 || Mount Lemmon || Mount Lemmon Survey || — || align=right data-sort-value="0.76" | 760 m || 
|-id=106 bgcolor=#fefefe
| 301106 ||  || — || November 6, 2008 || Mount Lemmon || Mount Lemmon Survey || — || align=right | 1.2 km || 
|-id=107 bgcolor=#fefefe
| 301107 ||  || — || November 6, 2008 || Mount Lemmon || Mount Lemmon Survey || — || align=right data-sort-value="0.81" | 810 m || 
|-id=108 bgcolor=#fefefe
| 301108 ||  || — || November 8, 2008 || Kitt Peak || Spacewatch || FLO || align=right data-sort-value="0.83" | 830 m || 
|-id=109 bgcolor=#E9E9E9
| 301109 ||  || — || November 1, 2008 || Kitt Peak || Spacewatch || — || align=right | 1.3 km || 
|-id=110 bgcolor=#fefefe
| 301110 ||  || — || November 6, 2008 || Kitt Peak || Spacewatch || — || align=right | 1.00 km || 
|-id=111 bgcolor=#fefefe
| 301111 ||  || — || November 17, 2008 || Kitt Peak || Spacewatch || — || align=right data-sort-value="0.85" | 850 m || 
|-id=112 bgcolor=#fefefe
| 301112 ||  || — || November 18, 2008 || Socorro || LINEAR || — || align=right data-sort-value="0.87" | 870 m || 
|-id=113 bgcolor=#fefefe
| 301113 ||  || — || November 18, 2008 || Catalina || CSS || — || align=right data-sort-value="0.81" | 810 m || 
|-id=114 bgcolor=#fefefe
| 301114 ||  || — || November 18, 2008 || Kitt Peak || Spacewatch || — || align=right data-sort-value="0.89" | 890 m || 
|-id=115 bgcolor=#fefefe
| 301115 ||  || — || November 17, 2008 || Kitt Peak || Spacewatch || — || align=right data-sort-value="0.83" | 830 m || 
|-id=116 bgcolor=#fefefe
| 301116 ||  || — || November 17, 2008 || Kitt Peak || Spacewatch || MAS || align=right data-sort-value="0.99" | 990 m || 
|-id=117 bgcolor=#fefefe
| 301117 ||  || — || November 17, 2008 || Kitt Peak || Spacewatch || — || align=right data-sort-value="0.78" | 780 m || 
|-id=118 bgcolor=#fefefe
| 301118 ||  || — || November 18, 2008 || Kitt Peak || Spacewatch || FLO || align=right data-sort-value="0.62" | 620 m || 
|-id=119 bgcolor=#fefefe
| 301119 ||  || — || October 24, 1998 || Kitt Peak || Spacewatch || — || align=right data-sort-value="0.62" | 620 m || 
|-id=120 bgcolor=#fefefe
| 301120 ||  || — || November 22, 2008 || Farra d'Isonzo || Farra d'Isonzo || V || align=right data-sort-value="0.73" | 730 m || 
|-id=121 bgcolor=#fefefe
| 301121 ||  || — || November 22, 2008 || Pla D'Arguines || R. Ferrando || — || align=right data-sort-value="0.79" | 790 m || 
|-id=122 bgcolor=#fefefe
| 301122 ||  || — || September 28, 2008 || Mount Lemmon || Mount Lemmon Survey || NYS || align=right | 2.5 km || 
|-id=123 bgcolor=#fefefe
| 301123 ||  || — || November 18, 2008 || Kitt Peak || Spacewatch || — || align=right data-sort-value="0.91" | 910 m || 
|-id=124 bgcolor=#fefefe
| 301124 ||  || — || November 18, 2008 || Kitt Peak || Spacewatch || — || align=right data-sort-value="0.84" | 840 m || 
|-id=125 bgcolor=#fefefe
| 301125 ||  || — || November 20, 2008 || Kitt Peak || Spacewatch || — || align=right data-sort-value="0.96" | 960 m || 
|-id=126 bgcolor=#fefefe
| 301126 ||  || — || November 22, 2008 || Mount Lemmon || Mount Lemmon Survey || V || align=right data-sort-value="0.92" | 920 m || 
|-id=127 bgcolor=#d6d6d6
| 301127 ||  || — || November 23, 2008 || Mount Lemmon || Mount Lemmon Survey || HYG || align=right | 3.9 km || 
|-id=128 bgcolor=#fefefe
| 301128 ||  || — || November 28, 2008 || Vicques || M. Ory || — || align=right data-sort-value="0.77" | 770 m || 
|-id=129 bgcolor=#fefefe
| 301129 ||  || — || November 30, 2008 || Kitt Peak || Spacewatch || — || align=right data-sort-value="0.77" | 770 m || 
|-id=130 bgcolor=#fefefe
| 301130 ||  || — || November 30, 2008 || Kitt Peak || Spacewatch || FLO || align=right data-sort-value="0.56" | 560 m || 
|-id=131 bgcolor=#fefefe
| 301131 ||  || — || November 30, 2008 || Kitt Peak || Spacewatch || — || align=right data-sort-value="0.67" | 670 m || 
|-id=132 bgcolor=#fefefe
| 301132 ||  || — || November 21, 2008 || Kitt Peak || Spacewatch || FLO || align=right data-sort-value="0.59" | 590 m || 
|-id=133 bgcolor=#fefefe
| 301133 ||  || — || November 19, 2008 || Mount Lemmon || Mount Lemmon Survey || FLO || align=right | 1.0 km || 
|-id=134 bgcolor=#fefefe
| 301134 ||  || — || November 30, 2008 || Mount Lemmon || Mount Lemmon Survey || — || align=right data-sort-value="0.85" | 850 m || 
|-id=135 bgcolor=#fefefe
| 301135 ||  || — || December 1, 2008 || Catalina || CSS || FLO || align=right data-sort-value="0.62" | 620 m || 
|-id=136 bgcolor=#fefefe
| 301136 ||  || — || December 1, 2008 || Mount Lemmon || Mount Lemmon Survey || — || align=right data-sort-value="0.80" | 800 m || 
|-id=137 bgcolor=#fefefe
| 301137 ||  || — || December 1, 2008 || Kitt Peak || Spacewatch || V || align=right | 1.0 km || 
|-id=138 bgcolor=#fefefe
| 301138 ||  || — || December 2, 2008 || Kitt Peak || Spacewatch || V || align=right data-sort-value="0.86" | 860 m || 
|-id=139 bgcolor=#fefefe
| 301139 ||  || — || December 2, 2008 || Kitt Peak || Spacewatch || NYS || align=right data-sort-value="0.81" | 810 m || 
|-id=140 bgcolor=#fefefe
| 301140 ||  || — || December 4, 2008 || Mount Lemmon || Mount Lemmon Survey || — || align=right data-sort-value="0.91" | 910 m || 
|-id=141 bgcolor=#fefefe
| 301141 ||  || — || December 4, 2008 || Mount Lemmon || Mount Lemmon Survey || MAS || align=right data-sort-value="0.75" | 750 m || 
|-id=142 bgcolor=#E9E9E9
| 301142 ||  || — || December 4, 2008 || Mount Lemmon || Mount Lemmon Survey || — || align=right | 1.1 km || 
|-id=143 bgcolor=#fefefe
| 301143 ||  || — || December 4, 2008 || Mount Lemmon || Mount Lemmon Survey || — || align=right | 1.3 km || 
|-id=144 bgcolor=#E9E9E9
| 301144 ||  || — || December 4, 2008 || Mount Lemmon || Mount Lemmon Survey || — || align=right | 1.4 km || 
|-id=145 bgcolor=#fefefe
| 301145 ||  || — || December 4, 2008 || Mount Lemmon || Mount Lemmon Survey || MAS || align=right data-sort-value="0.72" | 720 m || 
|-id=146 bgcolor=#fefefe
| 301146 ||  || — || December 6, 2008 || Bisei SG Center || BATTeRS || — || align=right data-sort-value="0.85" | 850 m || 
|-id=147 bgcolor=#fefefe
| 301147 ||  || — || December 1, 2008 || Socorro || LINEAR || — || align=right data-sort-value="0.74" | 740 m || 
|-id=148 bgcolor=#d6d6d6
| 301148 ||  || — || December 5, 2008 || Kitt Peak || Spacewatch || KOR || align=right | 2.0 km || 
|-id=149 bgcolor=#fefefe
| 301149 ||  || — || December 4, 2008 || Kitt Peak || Spacewatch || — || align=right data-sort-value="0.87" | 870 m || 
|-id=150 bgcolor=#fefefe
| 301150 ||  || — || December 23, 2008 || Dauban || F. Kugel || SULfast? || align=right | 2.5 km || 
|-id=151 bgcolor=#fefefe
| 301151 ||  || — || December 19, 2008 || La Sagra || OAM Obs. || MAS || align=right data-sort-value="0.95" | 950 m || 
|-id=152 bgcolor=#fefefe
| 301152 ||  || — || November 19, 2004 || Catalina || CSS || NYS || align=right | 1.0 km || 
|-id=153 bgcolor=#fefefe
| 301153 Jinan ||  ||  || December 25, 2008 || Weihai || Shandong University Obs. || FLO || align=right data-sort-value="0.85" | 850 m || 
|-id=154 bgcolor=#E9E9E9
| 301154 ||  || — || December 21, 2008 || Mount Lemmon || Mount Lemmon Survey || — || align=right | 2.7 km || 
|-id=155 bgcolor=#fefefe
| 301155 ||  || — || December 21, 2008 || Mount Lemmon || Mount Lemmon Survey || — || align=right data-sort-value="0.91" | 910 m || 
|-id=156 bgcolor=#fefefe
| 301156 ||  || — || December 21, 2008 || Mount Lemmon || Mount Lemmon Survey || — || align=right | 1.2 km || 
|-id=157 bgcolor=#fefefe
| 301157 ||  || — || December 21, 2008 || Mount Lemmon || Mount Lemmon Survey || MAS || align=right data-sort-value="0.63" | 630 m || 
|-id=158 bgcolor=#E9E9E9
| 301158 ||  || — || December 21, 2008 || Mount Lemmon || Mount Lemmon Survey || — || align=right | 2.2 km || 
|-id=159 bgcolor=#fefefe
| 301159 ||  || — || December 20, 2008 || La Sagra || OAM Obs. || — || align=right | 1.1 km || 
|-id=160 bgcolor=#fefefe
| 301160 ||  || — || December 29, 2008 || Taunus || S. Karge, R. Kling || — || align=right | 1.0 km || 
|-id=161 bgcolor=#fefefe
| 301161 ||  || — || December 29, 2008 || Dauban || F. Kugel || ERI || align=right | 1.8 km || 
|-id=162 bgcolor=#fefefe
| 301162 ||  || — || December 31, 2008 || Bergisch Gladbach || W. Bickel || — || align=right data-sort-value="0.87" | 870 m || 
|-id=163 bgcolor=#fefefe
| 301163 ||  || — || December 22, 2008 || Kitt Peak || Spacewatch || NYS || align=right data-sort-value="0.89" | 890 m || 
|-id=164 bgcolor=#fefefe
| 301164 ||  || — || December 30, 2008 || Catalina || CSS || V || align=right data-sort-value="0.87" | 870 m || 
|-id=165 bgcolor=#fefefe
| 301165 ||  || — || December 29, 2008 || Mount Lemmon || Mount Lemmon Survey || FLO || align=right data-sort-value="0.80" | 800 m || 
|-id=166 bgcolor=#E9E9E9
| 301166 ||  || — || December 29, 2008 || Mount Lemmon || Mount Lemmon Survey || HNS || align=right | 1.1 km || 
|-id=167 bgcolor=#d6d6d6
| 301167 ||  || — || December 30, 2008 || Mount Lemmon || Mount Lemmon Survey || — || align=right | 6.1 km || 
|-id=168 bgcolor=#d6d6d6
| 301168 ||  || — || December 30, 2008 || Mount Lemmon || Mount Lemmon Survey || — || align=right | 3.7 km || 
|-id=169 bgcolor=#E9E9E9
| 301169 ||  || — || December 30, 2008 || Mount Lemmon || Mount Lemmon Survey || — || align=right | 2.3 km || 
|-id=170 bgcolor=#fefefe
| 301170 ||  || — || December 29, 2008 || Mount Lemmon || Mount Lemmon Survey || — || align=right | 1.3 km || 
|-id=171 bgcolor=#fefefe
| 301171 ||  || — || December 30, 2008 || Mount Lemmon || Mount Lemmon Survey || NYS || align=right | 2.5 km || 
|-id=172 bgcolor=#E9E9E9
| 301172 ||  || — || December 29, 2008 || Kitt Peak || Spacewatch || — || align=right | 1.6 km || 
|-id=173 bgcolor=#E9E9E9
| 301173 ||  || — || December 29, 2008 || Mount Lemmon || Mount Lemmon Survey || — || align=right | 3.2 km || 
|-id=174 bgcolor=#E9E9E9
| 301174 ||  || — || December 29, 2008 || Kitt Peak || Spacewatch || — || align=right | 1.1 km || 
|-id=175 bgcolor=#fefefe
| 301175 ||  || — || December 29, 2008 || Kitt Peak || Spacewatch || — || align=right data-sort-value="0.86" | 860 m || 
|-id=176 bgcolor=#fefefe
| 301176 ||  || — || December 29, 2008 || Kitt Peak || Spacewatch || MAS || align=right data-sort-value="0.80" | 800 m || 
|-id=177 bgcolor=#fefefe
| 301177 ||  || — || December 29, 2008 || Kitt Peak || Spacewatch || — || align=right | 1.2 km || 
|-id=178 bgcolor=#fefefe
| 301178 ||  || — || December 29, 2008 || Kitt Peak || Spacewatch || NYS || align=right data-sort-value="0.75" | 750 m || 
|-id=179 bgcolor=#fefefe
| 301179 ||  || — || December 30, 2008 || Kitt Peak || Spacewatch || V || align=right data-sort-value="0.85" | 850 m || 
|-id=180 bgcolor=#E9E9E9
| 301180 ||  || — || December 31, 2008 || Kitt Peak || Spacewatch || — || align=right | 1.5 km || 
|-id=181 bgcolor=#fefefe
| 301181 ||  || — || December 30, 2008 || Kitt Peak || Spacewatch || SUL || align=right | 2.9 km || 
|-id=182 bgcolor=#fefefe
| 301182 ||  || — || December 30, 2008 || Kitt Peak || Spacewatch || MAS || align=right data-sort-value="0.75" | 750 m || 
|-id=183 bgcolor=#fefefe
| 301183 ||  || — || December 30, 2008 || Kitt Peak || Spacewatch || — || align=right data-sort-value="0.82" | 820 m || 
|-id=184 bgcolor=#fefefe
| 301184 ||  || — || December 30, 2008 || Kitt Peak || Spacewatch || MAS || align=right data-sort-value="0.65" | 650 m || 
|-id=185 bgcolor=#fefefe
| 301185 ||  || — || December 30, 2008 || Kitt Peak || Spacewatch || NYS || align=right data-sort-value="0.87" | 870 m || 
|-id=186 bgcolor=#d6d6d6
| 301186 ||  || — || December 30, 2008 || Kitt Peak || Spacewatch || — || align=right | 2.3 km || 
|-id=187 bgcolor=#E9E9E9
| 301187 ||  || — || December 31, 2008 || Kitt Peak || Spacewatch || — || align=right | 1.4 km || 
|-id=188 bgcolor=#E9E9E9
| 301188 ||  || — || December 22, 2008 || Kitt Peak || Spacewatch || — || align=right | 2.7 km || 
|-id=189 bgcolor=#E9E9E9
| 301189 ||  || — || December 30, 2008 || Mount Lemmon || Mount Lemmon Survey || — || align=right | 1.3 km || 
|-id=190 bgcolor=#fefefe
| 301190 ||  || — || December 21, 2008 || Mount Lemmon || Mount Lemmon Survey || MAS || align=right data-sort-value="0.88" | 880 m || 
|-id=191 bgcolor=#E9E9E9
| 301191 ||  || — || December 21, 2008 || Mount Lemmon || Mount Lemmon Survey || — || align=right | 1.6 km || 
|-id=192 bgcolor=#E9E9E9
| 301192 ||  || — || December 29, 2008 || Mount Lemmon || Mount Lemmon Survey || EUN || align=right | 1.6 km || 
|-id=193 bgcolor=#fefefe
| 301193 ||  || — || December 21, 2008 || Socorro || LINEAR || V || align=right | 1.1 km || 
|-id=194 bgcolor=#E9E9E9
| 301194 ||  || — || December 21, 2008 || Socorro || LINEAR || — || align=right | 1.3 km || 
|-id=195 bgcolor=#fefefe
| 301195 ||  || — || December 21, 2008 || Catalina || CSS || NYS || align=right data-sort-value="0.90" | 900 m || 
|-id=196 bgcolor=#E9E9E9
| 301196 ||  || — || December 31, 2008 || Catalina || CSS || — || align=right | 2.1 km || 
|-id=197 bgcolor=#fefefe
| 301197 ||  || — || December 30, 2008 || Mount Lemmon || Mount Lemmon Survey || V || align=right data-sort-value="0.94" | 940 m || 
|-id=198 bgcolor=#fefefe
| 301198 ||  || — || December 31, 2008 || Socorro || LINEAR || — || align=right data-sort-value="0.95" | 950 m || 
|-id=199 bgcolor=#E9E9E9
| 301199 ||  || — || December 30, 2008 || Mount Lemmon || Mount Lemmon Survey || — || align=right | 3.4 km || 
|-id=200 bgcolor=#E9E9E9
| 301200 || 2009 AH || — || January 1, 2009 || Mayhill || A. Lowe || GEF || align=right | 1.6 km || 
|}

301201–301300 

|-bgcolor=#fefefe
| 301201 ||  || — || January 2, 2009 || Mount Lemmon || Mount Lemmon Survey || V || align=right data-sort-value="0.96" | 960 m || 
|-id=202 bgcolor=#fefefe
| 301202 ||  || — || January 3, 2009 || Kitt Peak || Spacewatch || — || align=right data-sort-value="0.68" | 680 m || 
|-id=203 bgcolor=#E9E9E9
| 301203 ||  || — || January 3, 2009 || Kitt Peak || Spacewatch || MAR || align=right | 1.2 km || 
|-id=204 bgcolor=#E9E9E9
| 301204 ||  || — || January 2, 2009 || Kitt Peak || Spacewatch || — || align=right | 1.5 km || 
|-id=205 bgcolor=#fefefe
| 301205 ||  || — || December 18, 2001 || Kitt Peak || Spacewatch || — || align=right data-sort-value="0.74" | 740 m || 
|-id=206 bgcolor=#E9E9E9
| 301206 ||  || — || January 15, 2009 || Kitt Peak || Spacewatch || — || align=right | 1.2 km || 
|-id=207 bgcolor=#fefefe
| 301207 ||  || — || January 15, 2009 || Kitt Peak || Spacewatch || — || align=right data-sort-value="0.98" | 980 m || 
|-id=208 bgcolor=#E9E9E9
| 301208 ||  || — || January 15, 2009 || Kitt Peak || Spacewatch || — || align=right | 1.6 km || 
|-id=209 bgcolor=#E9E9E9
| 301209 ||  || — || January 2, 2009 || Mount Lemmon || Mount Lemmon Survey || — || align=right | 1.9 km || 
|-id=210 bgcolor=#d6d6d6
| 301210 ||  || — || January 3, 2009 || Mount Lemmon || Mount Lemmon Survey || KOR || align=right | 1.4 km || 
|-id=211 bgcolor=#E9E9E9
| 301211 ||  || — || January 3, 2009 || Mount Lemmon || Mount Lemmon Survey || — || align=right | 1.5 km || 
|-id=212 bgcolor=#E9E9E9
| 301212 ||  || — || January 3, 2009 || Mount Lemmon || Mount Lemmon Survey || MRX || align=right | 1.1 km || 
|-id=213 bgcolor=#d6d6d6
| 301213 ||  || — || January 2, 2009 || Kitt Peak || Spacewatch || — || align=right | 2.9 km || 
|-id=214 bgcolor=#fefefe
| 301214 ||  || — || January 1, 2009 || Mount Lemmon || Mount Lemmon Survey || — || align=right data-sort-value="0.79" | 790 m || 
|-id=215 bgcolor=#E9E9E9
| 301215 ||  || — || January 15, 2009 || Kitt Peak || Spacewatch || — || align=right | 3.0 km || 
|-id=216 bgcolor=#fefefe
| 301216 ||  || — || January 2, 2009 || Mount Lemmon || Mount Lemmon Survey || — || align=right data-sort-value="0.94" | 940 m || 
|-id=217 bgcolor=#E9E9E9
| 301217 ||  || — || January 1, 2009 || Kitt Peak || Spacewatch || — || align=right data-sort-value="0.98" | 980 m || 
|-id=218 bgcolor=#fefefe
| 301218 ||  || — || January 3, 2009 || Catalina || CSS || — || align=right | 3.9 km || 
|-id=219 bgcolor=#fefefe
| 301219 ||  || — || January 18, 2009 || Weihai || Shandong University Obs. || — || align=right data-sort-value="0.91" | 910 m || 
|-id=220 bgcolor=#fefefe
| 301220 ||  || — || January 18, 2009 || Socorro || LINEAR || — || align=right | 1.1 km || 
|-id=221 bgcolor=#fefefe
| 301221 ||  || — || January 20, 2009 || Tzec Maun || F. Tozzi || — || align=right | 1.4 km || 
|-id=222 bgcolor=#fefefe
| 301222 ||  || — || January 18, 2009 || Socorro || LINEAR || — || align=right | 1.2 km || 
|-id=223 bgcolor=#fefefe
| 301223 ||  || — || January 18, 2009 || Socorro || LINEAR || — || align=right data-sort-value="0.95" | 950 m || 
|-id=224 bgcolor=#fefefe
| 301224 ||  || — || January 17, 2009 || Socorro || LINEAR || MAS || align=right data-sort-value="0.82" | 820 m || 
|-id=225 bgcolor=#fefefe
| 301225 ||  || — || January 17, 2009 || Socorro || LINEAR || NYS || align=right data-sort-value="0.71" | 710 m || 
|-id=226 bgcolor=#fefefe
| 301226 ||  || — || January 21, 2009 || Socorro || LINEAR || — || align=right | 1.4 km || 
|-id=227 bgcolor=#E9E9E9
| 301227 ||  || — || January 22, 2009 || Socorro || LINEAR || — || align=right | 1.6 km || 
|-id=228 bgcolor=#fefefe
| 301228 ||  || — || January 22, 2009 || Socorro || LINEAR || — || align=right | 1.4 km || 
|-id=229 bgcolor=#E9E9E9
| 301229 ||  || — || January 26, 2009 || Mayhill || A. Lowe || — || align=right | 1.3 km || 
|-id=230 bgcolor=#fefefe
| 301230 ||  || — || January 16, 2009 || Mount Lemmon || Mount Lemmon Survey || MAS || align=right data-sort-value="0.77" | 770 m || 
|-id=231 bgcolor=#E9E9E9
| 301231 ||  || — || January 16, 2009 || Mount Lemmon || Mount Lemmon Survey || AGN || align=right | 1.1 km || 
|-id=232 bgcolor=#fefefe
| 301232 ||  || — || January 17, 2009 || Kitt Peak || Spacewatch || NYS || align=right data-sort-value="0.79" | 790 m || 
|-id=233 bgcolor=#fefefe
| 301233 ||  || — || January 19, 2009 || Mount Lemmon || Mount Lemmon Survey || MAS || align=right data-sort-value="0.98" | 980 m || 
|-id=234 bgcolor=#fefefe
| 301234 ||  || — || January 16, 2009 || Kitt Peak || Spacewatch || FLO || align=right data-sort-value="0.77" | 770 m || 
|-id=235 bgcolor=#E9E9E9
| 301235 ||  || — || January 16, 2009 || Kitt Peak || Spacewatch || — || align=right | 1.3 km || 
|-id=236 bgcolor=#E9E9E9
| 301236 ||  || — || January 16, 2009 || Kitt Peak || Spacewatch || NEM || align=right | 2.3 km || 
|-id=237 bgcolor=#fefefe
| 301237 ||  || — || January 16, 2009 || Kitt Peak || Spacewatch || ERI || align=right | 2.0 km || 
|-id=238 bgcolor=#d6d6d6
| 301238 ||  || — || January 16, 2009 || Kitt Peak || Spacewatch || Tj (2.98) || align=right | 6.4 km || 
|-id=239 bgcolor=#fefefe
| 301239 ||  || — || January 16, 2009 || Kitt Peak || Spacewatch || V || align=right data-sort-value="0.95" | 950 m || 
|-id=240 bgcolor=#fefefe
| 301240 ||  || — || January 16, 2009 || Kitt Peak || Spacewatch || — || align=right | 1.0 km || 
|-id=241 bgcolor=#E9E9E9
| 301241 ||  || — || January 16, 2009 || Kitt Peak || Spacewatch || — || align=right | 1.1 km || 
|-id=242 bgcolor=#d6d6d6
| 301242 ||  || — || January 16, 2009 || Kitt Peak || Spacewatch || KAR || align=right | 1.2 km || 
|-id=243 bgcolor=#fefefe
| 301243 ||  || — || January 16, 2009 || Kitt Peak || Spacewatch || MAS || align=right data-sort-value="0.85" | 850 m || 
|-id=244 bgcolor=#d6d6d6
| 301244 ||  || — || January 16, 2009 || Kitt Peak || Spacewatch || KOR || align=right | 1.6 km || 
|-id=245 bgcolor=#E9E9E9
| 301245 ||  || — || January 16, 2009 || Kitt Peak || Spacewatch || HOF || align=right | 2.3 km || 
|-id=246 bgcolor=#E9E9E9
| 301246 ||  || — || January 16, 2009 || Kitt Peak || Spacewatch || — || align=right | 2.1 km || 
|-id=247 bgcolor=#fefefe
| 301247 ||  || — || January 16, 2009 || Kitt Peak || Spacewatch || NYS || align=right data-sort-value="0.71" | 710 m || 
|-id=248 bgcolor=#E9E9E9
| 301248 ||  || — || January 16, 2009 || Mount Lemmon || Mount Lemmon Survey || AGN || align=right | 1.2 km || 
|-id=249 bgcolor=#E9E9E9
| 301249 ||  || — || January 16, 2009 || Kitt Peak || Spacewatch || — || align=right | 1.3 km || 
|-id=250 bgcolor=#E9E9E9
| 301250 ||  || — || January 16, 2009 || Mount Lemmon || Mount Lemmon Survey || — || align=right | 3.0 km || 
|-id=251 bgcolor=#d6d6d6
| 301251 ||  || — || January 16, 2009 || Mount Lemmon || Mount Lemmon Survey || — || align=right | 2.8 km || 
|-id=252 bgcolor=#fefefe
| 301252 ||  || — || January 16, 2009 || Mount Lemmon || Mount Lemmon Survey || NYS || align=right data-sort-value="0.91" | 910 m || 
|-id=253 bgcolor=#fefefe
| 301253 ||  || — || January 16, 2009 || Mount Lemmon || Mount Lemmon Survey || — || align=right | 1.1 km || 
|-id=254 bgcolor=#E9E9E9
| 301254 ||  || — || January 16, 2009 || Mount Lemmon || Mount Lemmon Survey || EUN || align=right | 1.2 km || 
|-id=255 bgcolor=#fefefe
| 301255 ||  || — || January 16, 2009 || Mount Lemmon || Mount Lemmon Survey || — || align=right data-sort-value="0.90" | 900 m || 
|-id=256 bgcolor=#E9E9E9
| 301256 ||  || — || January 20, 2009 || Kitt Peak || Spacewatch || NEM || align=right | 2.9 km || 
|-id=257 bgcolor=#fefefe
| 301257 ||  || — || January 25, 2009 || Catalina || CSS || NYS || align=right data-sort-value="0.82" | 820 m || 
|-id=258 bgcolor=#E9E9E9
| 301258 ||  || — || January 25, 2009 || Catalina || CSS || — || align=right | 1.4 km || 
|-id=259 bgcolor=#E9E9E9
| 301259 ||  || — || January 25, 2009 || Catalina || CSS || — || align=right | 2.8 km || 
|-id=260 bgcolor=#E9E9E9
| 301260 ||  || — || January 26, 2009 || Purple Mountain || PMO NEO || JUN || align=right | 1.8 km || 
|-id=261 bgcolor=#fefefe
| 301261 ||  || — || December 19, 2004 || Mount Lemmon || Mount Lemmon Survey || — || align=right data-sort-value="0.90" | 900 m || 
|-id=262 bgcolor=#E9E9E9
| 301262 ||  || — || January 28, 2009 || Catalina || CSS || DOR || align=right | 3.6 km || 
|-id=263 bgcolor=#fefefe
| 301263 Anitaheward ||  ||  || January 30, 2009 || Haleakala || R. Miles || — || align=right | 1.1 km || 
|-id=264 bgcolor=#fefefe
| 301264 ||  || — || January 25, 2009 || Socorro || LINEAR || V || align=right | 1.1 km || 
|-id=265 bgcolor=#E9E9E9
| 301265 ||  || — || January 29, 2009 || Wildberg || R. Apitzsch || — || align=right | 1.7 km || 
|-id=266 bgcolor=#fefefe
| 301266 ||  || — || January 30, 2009 || Socorro || LINEAR || — || align=right | 1.2 km || 
|-id=267 bgcolor=#E9E9E9
| 301267 ||  || — || January 31, 2009 || Socorro || LINEAR || — || align=right | 3.4 km || 
|-id=268 bgcolor=#E9E9E9
| 301268 ||  || — || January 29, 2009 || Pla D'Arguines || R. Ferrando || — || align=right | 1.2 km || 
|-id=269 bgcolor=#E9E9E9
| 301269 ||  || — || January 31, 2009 || Kitt Peak || Spacewatch || — || align=right data-sort-value="0.85" | 850 m || 
|-id=270 bgcolor=#fefefe
| 301270 ||  || — || January 31, 2009 || Kitt Peak || Spacewatch || — || align=right data-sort-value="0.98" | 980 m || 
|-id=271 bgcolor=#fefefe
| 301271 ||  || — || January 31, 2009 || Kitt Peak || Spacewatch || MAS || align=right data-sort-value="0.76" | 760 m || 
|-id=272 bgcolor=#fefefe
| 301272 ||  || — || January 25, 2009 || Kitt Peak || Spacewatch || NYS || align=right data-sort-value="0.76" | 760 m || 
|-id=273 bgcolor=#fefefe
| 301273 ||  || — || January 25, 2009 || Kitt Peak || Spacewatch || MAS || align=right data-sort-value="0.65" | 650 m || 
|-id=274 bgcolor=#E9E9E9
| 301274 ||  || — || January 25, 2009 || Kitt Peak || Spacewatch || HEN || align=right data-sort-value="0.98" | 980 m || 
|-id=275 bgcolor=#fefefe
| 301275 ||  || — || January 25, 2009 || Kitt Peak || Spacewatch || MAS || align=right data-sort-value="0.75" | 750 m || 
|-id=276 bgcolor=#E9E9E9
| 301276 ||  || — || January 25, 2009 || Kitt Peak || Spacewatch || — || align=right | 1.7 km || 
|-id=277 bgcolor=#E9E9E9
| 301277 ||  || — || January 25, 2009 || Kitt Peak || Spacewatch || — || align=right | 1.4 km || 
|-id=278 bgcolor=#fefefe
| 301278 ||  || — || January 25, 2009 || Kitt Peak || Spacewatch || EUT || align=right data-sort-value="0.61" | 610 m || 
|-id=279 bgcolor=#fefefe
| 301279 ||  || — || January 25, 2009 || Kitt Peak || Spacewatch || V || align=right data-sort-value="0.93" | 930 m || 
|-id=280 bgcolor=#E9E9E9
| 301280 ||  || — || January 25, 2009 || Kitt Peak || Spacewatch || — || align=right | 1.6 km || 
|-id=281 bgcolor=#fefefe
| 301281 ||  || — || January 26, 2009 || Mount Lemmon || Mount Lemmon Survey || — || align=right | 1.1 km || 
|-id=282 bgcolor=#E9E9E9
| 301282 ||  || — || January 25, 2009 || Kitt Peak || Spacewatch || — || align=right data-sort-value="0.79" | 790 m || 
|-id=283 bgcolor=#E9E9E9
| 301283 ||  || — || January 25, 2009 || Kitt Peak || Spacewatch || — || align=right | 1.0 km || 
|-id=284 bgcolor=#d6d6d6
| 301284 ||  || — || January 25, 2009 || Kitt Peak || Spacewatch || — || align=right | 5.6 km || 
|-id=285 bgcolor=#d6d6d6
| 301285 ||  || — || January 29, 2009 || Mount Lemmon || Mount Lemmon Survey || — || align=right | 3.2 km || 
|-id=286 bgcolor=#d6d6d6
| 301286 ||  || — || January 29, 2009 || Mount Lemmon || Mount Lemmon Survey || CHA || align=right | 2.5 km || 
|-id=287 bgcolor=#E9E9E9
| 301287 ||  || — || January 29, 2009 || Mount Lemmon || Mount Lemmon Survey || — || align=right | 1.9 km || 
|-id=288 bgcolor=#d6d6d6
| 301288 ||  || — || January 30, 2009 || Bergisch Gladbac || W. Bickel || — || align=right | 5.2 km || 
|-id=289 bgcolor=#d6d6d6
| 301289 ||  || — || January 31, 2009 || Mount Lemmon || Mount Lemmon Survey || — || align=right | 4.1 km || 
|-id=290 bgcolor=#d6d6d6
| 301290 ||  || — || January 24, 2009 || Cerro Burek || Alianza S4 Obs. || — || align=right | 3.8 km || 
|-id=291 bgcolor=#E9E9E9
| 301291 ||  || — || January 26, 2009 || Mount Lemmon || Mount Lemmon Survey || — || align=right | 1.5 km || 
|-id=292 bgcolor=#d6d6d6
| 301292 ||  || — || January 31, 2009 || Kitt Peak || Spacewatch || — || align=right | 2.6 km || 
|-id=293 bgcolor=#d6d6d6
| 301293 ||  || — || January 31, 2009 || Kitt Peak || Spacewatch || — || align=right | 3.5 km || 
|-id=294 bgcolor=#d6d6d6
| 301294 ||  || — || January 31, 2009 || Kitt Peak || Spacewatch || — || align=right | 3.5 km || 
|-id=295 bgcolor=#E9E9E9
| 301295 ||  || — || January 31, 2009 || Kitt Peak || Spacewatch || — || align=right | 2.5 km || 
|-id=296 bgcolor=#E9E9E9
| 301296 ||  || — || January 31, 2009 || Kitt Peak || Spacewatch || — || align=right | 2.7 km || 
|-id=297 bgcolor=#d6d6d6
| 301297 ||  || — || January 31, 2009 || Kitt Peak || Spacewatch || EOS || align=right | 2.4 km || 
|-id=298 bgcolor=#d6d6d6
| 301298 ||  || — || January 28, 2009 || Kitt Peak || Spacewatch || — || align=right | 4.0 km || 
|-id=299 bgcolor=#E9E9E9
| 301299 ||  || — || January 29, 2009 || Kitt Peak || Spacewatch || WIT || align=right | 1.2 km || 
|-id=300 bgcolor=#E9E9E9
| 301300 ||  || — || January 30, 2009 || Kitt Peak || Spacewatch || HOF || align=right | 3.4 km || 
|}

301301–301400 

|-bgcolor=#d6d6d6
| 301301 ||  || — || January 31, 2009 || Mount Lemmon || Mount Lemmon Survey || EOS || align=right | 3.1 km || 
|-id=302 bgcolor=#fefefe
| 301302 ||  || — || January 31, 2009 || Mount Lemmon || Mount Lemmon Survey || — || align=right | 1.0 km || 
|-id=303 bgcolor=#d6d6d6
| 301303 ||  || — || January 31, 2009 || Mount Lemmon || Mount Lemmon Survey || — || align=right | 3.2 km || 
|-id=304 bgcolor=#E9E9E9
| 301304 ||  || — || January 29, 2009 || Kitt Peak || Spacewatch || — || align=right | 2.4 km || 
|-id=305 bgcolor=#E9E9E9
| 301305 ||  || — || January 29, 2009 || Kitt Peak || Spacewatch || HEN || align=right data-sort-value="0.93" | 930 m || 
|-id=306 bgcolor=#fefefe
| 301306 ||  || — || January 29, 2009 || Kitt Peak || Spacewatch || — || align=right data-sort-value="0.91" | 910 m || 
|-id=307 bgcolor=#E9E9E9
| 301307 ||  || — || January 29, 2009 || Kitt Peak || Spacewatch || — || align=right | 1.5 km || 
|-id=308 bgcolor=#fefefe
| 301308 ||  || — || January 29, 2009 || Kitt Peak || Spacewatch || — || align=right data-sort-value="0.90" | 900 m || 
|-id=309 bgcolor=#E9E9E9
| 301309 ||  || — || January 30, 2009 || Mount Lemmon || Mount Lemmon Survey || — || align=right data-sort-value="0.87" | 870 m || 
|-id=310 bgcolor=#E9E9E9
| 301310 ||  || — || January 30, 2009 || Kitt Peak || Spacewatch || HEN || align=right | 1.4 km || 
|-id=311 bgcolor=#E9E9E9
| 301311 ||  || — || January 30, 2009 || Mount Lemmon || Mount Lemmon Survey || — || align=right | 1.3 km || 
|-id=312 bgcolor=#fefefe
| 301312 ||  || — || December 18, 2004 || Mount Lemmon || Mount Lemmon Survey || — || align=right data-sort-value="0.97" | 970 m || 
|-id=313 bgcolor=#E9E9E9
| 301313 ||  || — || January 30, 2009 || Mount Lemmon || Mount Lemmon Survey || AGN || align=right | 1.4 km || 
|-id=314 bgcolor=#fefefe
| 301314 ||  || — || January 31, 2009 || Mount Lemmon || Mount Lemmon Survey || NYS || align=right data-sort-value="0.79" | 790 m || 
|-id=315 bgcolor=#fefefe
| 301315 ||  || — || January 31, 2009 || Kitt Peak || Spacewatch || MAS || align=right data-sort-value="0.86" | 860 m || 
|-id=316 bgcolor=#E9E9E9
| 301316 ||  || — || January 27, 2009 || Purple Mountain || PMO NEO || — || align=right | 2.1 km || 
|-id=317 bgcolor=#E9E9E9
| 301317 ||  || — || January 31, 2009 || Kitt Peak || Spacewatch || — || align=right | 1.5 km || 
|-id=318 bgcolor=#d6d6d6
| 301318 ||  || — || January 31, 2009 || Kitt Peak || Spacewatch || — || align=right | 4.7 km || 
|-id=319 bgcolor=#d6d6d6
| 301319 ||  || — || January 31, 2009 || Kitt Peak || Spacewatch || — || align=right | 3.7 km || 
|-id=320 bgcolor=#E9E9E9
| 301320 ||  || — || January 31, 2009 || Kitt Peak || Spacewatch || — || align=right data-sort-value="0.91" | 910 m || 
|-id=321 bgcolor=#d6d6d6
| 301321 ||  || — || January 30, 2009 || Mount Lemmon || Mount Lemmon Survey || — || align=right | 4.4 km || 
|-id=322 bgcolor=#E9E9E9
| 301322 ||  || — || January 24, 2009 || Cerro Burek || Alianza S4 Obs. || — || align=right | 1.5 km || 
|-id=323 bgcolor=#d6d6d6
| 301323 ||  || — || January 24, 2009 || Cerro Burek || Alianza S4 Obs. || EOS || align=right | 4.3 km || 
|-id=324 bgcolor=#E9E9E9
| 301324 ||  || — || January 16, 2009 || Kitt Peak || Spacewatch || — || align=right | 1.7 km || 
|-id=325 bgcolor=#fefefe
| 301325 ||  || — || January 17, 2009 || Kitt Peak || Spacewatch || — || align=right data-sort-value="0.94" | 940 m || 
|-id=326 bgcolor=#fefefe
| 301326 ||  || — || January 20, 2009 || Mount Lemmon || Mount Lemmon Survey || — || align=right data-sort-value="0.87" | 870 m || 
|-id=327 bgcolor=#E9E9E9
| 301327 ||  || — || January 20, 2009 || Catalina || CSS || — || align=right | 2.9 km || 
|-id=328 bgcolor=#d6d6d6
| 301328 ||  || — || January 31, 2009 || Mount Lemmon || Mount Lemmon Survey || HYG || align=right | 2.9 km || 
|-id=329 bgcolor=#d6d6d6
| 301329 ||  || — || January 31, 2009 || Kitt Peak || Spacewatch || — || align=right | 2.8 km || 
|-id=330 bgcolor=#d6d6d6
| 301330 ||  || — || January 25, 2009 || Kitt Peak || Spacewatch || — || align=right | 2.7 km || 
|-id=331 bgcolor=#d6d6d6
| 301331 ||  || — || January 30, 2009 || Mount Lemmon || Mount Lemmon Survey || HYG || align=right | 3.7 km || 
|-id=332 bgcolor=#E9E9E9
| 301332 ||  || — || January 30, 2009 || Mount Lemmon || Mount Lemmon Survey || JUN || align=right | 1.2 km || 
|-id=333 bgcolor=#d6d6d6
| 301333 ||  || — || January 31, 2009 || Kitt Peak || Spacewatch || — || align=right | 3.0 km || 
|-id=334 bgcolor=#fefefe
| 301334 ||  || — || January 31, 2009 || Mount Lemmon || Mount Lemmon Survey || — || align=right data-sort-value="0.86" | 860 m || 
|-id=335 bgcolor=#fefefe
| 301335 ||  || — || January 25, 2009 || Kitt Peak || Spacewatch || — || align=right data-sort-value="0.75" | 750 m || 
|-id=336 bgcolor=#d6d6d6
| 301336 ||  || — || January 25, 2009 || Kitt Peak || Spacewatch || KOR || align=right | 1.3 km || 
|-id=337 bgcolor=#E9E9E9
| 301337 ||  || — || January 20, 2009 || Socorro || LINEAR || — || align=right | 2.3 km || 
|-id=338 bgcolor=#d6d6d6
| 301338 ||  || — || January 20, 2009 || Socorro || LINEAR || — || align=right | 3.8 km || 
|-id=339 bgcolor=#d6d6d6
| 301339 ||  || — || January 26, 2009 || Socorro || LINEAR || — || align=right | 4.4 km || 
|-id=340 bgcolor=#E9E9E9
| 301340 ||  || — || January 31, 2009 || Kitt Peak || Spacewatch || GEF || align=right | 1.7 km || 
|-id=341 bgcolor=#fefefe
| 301341 ||  || — || January 23, 2009 || Purple Mountain || PMO NEO || — || align=right | 1.1 km || 
|-id=342 bgcolor=#E9E9E9
| 301342 ||  || — || January 25, 2009 || Kitt Peak || Spacewatch || AGN || align=right | 1.5 km || 
|-id=343 bgcolor=#E9E9E9
| 301343 ||  || — || January 25, 2009 || Catalina || CSS || — || align=right | 3.2 km || 
|-id=344 bgcolor=#E9E9E9
| 301344 ||  || — || January 25, 2009 || Catalina || CSS || — || align=right | 2.5 km || 
|-id=345 bgcolor=#E9E9E9
| 301345 ||  || — || February 1, 2009 || Great Shefford || P. Birtwhistle || KON || align=right | 2.4 km || 
|-id=346 bgcolor=#fefefe
| 301346 ||  || — || February 1, 2009 || Mount Lemmon || Mount Lemmon Survey || — || align=right data-sort-value="0.83" | 830 m || 
|-id=347 bgcolor=#fefefe
| 301347 ||  || — || February 1, 2009 || Mount Lemmon || Mount Lemmon Survey || NYS || align=right data-sort-value="0.58" | 580 m || 
|-id=348 bgcolor=#fefefe
| 301348 ||  || — || February 1, 2009 || Mount Lemmon || Mount Lemmon Survey || V || align=right data-sort-value="0.76" | 760 m || 
|-id=349 bgcolor=#E9E9E9
| 301349 ||  || — || February 1, 2009 || Mount Lemmon || Mount Lemmon Survey || — || align=right | 3.2 km || 
|-id=350 bgcolor=#E9E9E9
| 301350 ||  || — || February 1, 2009 || Kitt Peak || Spacewatch || — || align=right | 2.2 km || 
|-id=351 bgcolor=#d6d6d6
| 301351 ||  || — || February 1, 2009 || Kitt Peak || Spacewatch || — || align=right | 2.8 km || 
|-id=352 bgcolor=#E9E9E9
| 301352 ||  || — || February 1, 2009 || Mount Lemmon || Mount Lemmon Survey || — || align=right | 2.2 km || 
|-id=353 bgcolor=#E9E9E9
| 301353 ||  || — || February 1, 2009 || Kitt Peak || Spacewatch || — || align=right data-sort-value="0.91" | 910 m || 
|-id=354 bgcolor=#E9E9E9
| 301354 ||  || — || February 1, 2009 || Kitt Peak || Spacewatch || WIT || align=right | 1.0 km || 
|-id=355 bgcolor=#E9E9E9
| 301355 ||  || — || February 1, 2009 || Kitt Peak || Spacewatch || — || align=right | 2.2 km || 
|-id=356 bgcolor=#E9E9E9
| 301356 ||  || — || February 1, 2009 || Kitt Peak || Spacewatch || — || align=right | 1.8 km || 
|-id=357 bgcolor=#fefefe
| 301357 ||  || — || February 1, 2009 || Kitt Peak || Spacewatch || NYS || align=right data-sort-value="0.82" | 820 m || 
|-id=358 bgcolor=#fefefe
| 301358 ||  || — || February 4, 2009 || Mount Lemmon || Mount Lemmon Survey || NYS || align=right data-sort-value="0.79" | 790 m || 
|-id=359 bgcolor=#E9E9E9
| 301359 ||  || — || February 13, 2009 || Kitt Peak || Spacewatch || — || align=right | 1.8 km || 
|-id=360 bgcolor=#E9E9E9
| 301360 ||  || — || February 13, 2009 || Kitt Peak || Spacewatch || MAR || align=right | 1.5 km || 
|-id=361 bgcolor=#E9E9E9
| 301361 ||  || — || February 13, 2009 || Kitt Peak || Spacewatch || — || align=right | 1.7 km || 
|-id=362 bgcolor=#E9E9E9
| 301362 ||  || — || February 14, 2009 || Catalina || CSS || ADE || align=right | 2.8 km || 
|-id=363 bgcolor=#d6d6d6
| 301363 ||  || — || February 14, 2009 || Kitt Peak || Spacewatch || — || align=right | 2.7 km || 
|-id=364 bgcolor=#d6d6d6
| 301364 ||  || — || February 14, 2009 || Kitt Peak || Spacewatch || HYG || align=right | 3.2 km || 
|-id=365 bgcolor=#d6d6d6
| 301365 ||  || — || February 14, 2009 || Kitt Peak || Spacewatch || — || align=right | 3.9 km || 
|-id=366 bgcolor=#E9E9E9
| 301366 ||  || — || February 14, 2009 || Mount Lemmon || Mount Lemmon Survey || — || align=right | 1.7 km || 
|-id=367 bgcolor=#d6d6d6
| 301367 ||  || — || February 14, 2009 || Mount Lemmon || Mount Lemmon Survey || EUP || align=right | 6.2 km || 
|-id=368 bgcolor=#d6d6d6
| 301368 ||  || — || February 14, 2009 || La Sagra || OAM Obs. || — || align=right | 3.6 km || 
|-id=369 bgcolor=#E9E9E9
| 301369 ||  || — || February 14, 2009 || La Sagra || OAM Obs. || — || align=right | 1.4 km || 
|-id=370 bgcolor=#d6d6d6
| 301370 ||  || — || February 14, 2009 || Mount Lemmon || Mount Lemmon Survey || KOR || align=right | 1.9 km || 
|-id=371 bgcolor=#E9E9E9
| 301371 ||  || — || February 13, 2009 || Kitt Peak || Spacewatch || — || align=right | 1.3 km || 
|-id=372 bgcolor=#E9E9E9
| 301372 ||  || — || February 14, 2009 || Mount Lemmon || Mount Lemmon Survey || — || align=right data-sort-value="0.90" | 900 m || 
|-id=373 bgcolor=#E9E9E9
| 301373 ||  || — || February 14, 2009 || Mount Lemmon || Mount Lemmon Survey || — || align=right | 1.1 km || 
|-id=374 bgcolor=#fefefe
| 301374 ||  || — || February 1, 2009 || Catalina || CSS || — || align=right | 1.3 km || 
|-id=375 bgcolor=#E9E9E9
| 301375 ||  || — || February 14, 2009 || Kitt Peak || Spacewatch || — || align=right | 3.1 km || 
|-id=376 bgcolor=#E9E9E9
| 301376 ||  || — || February 3, 2009 || Kitt Peak || Spacewatch || — || align=right | 2.6 km || 
|-id=377 bgcolor=#d6d6d6
| 301377 ||  || — || February 5, 2009 || Kitt Peak || Spacewatch || — || align=right | 3.8 km || 
|-id=378 bgcolor=#d6d6d6
| 301378 ||  || — || February 2, 2009 || Kitt Peak || Spacewatch || EOS || align=right | 2.7 km || 
|-id=379 bgcolor=#E9E9E9
| 301379 ||  || — || February 1, 2009 || Catalina || CSS || — || align=right | 3.0 km || 
|-id=380 bgcolor=#E9E9E9
| 301380 ||  || — || February 5, 2009 || Kitt Peak || Spacewatch || — || align=right | 2.0 km || 
|-id=381 bgcolor=#E9E9E9
| 301381 ||  || — || February 17, 2009 || Dauban || F. Kugel || — || align=right | 2.1 km || 
|-id=382 bgcolor=#E9E9E9
| 301382 ||  || — || February 18, 2009 || Socorro || LINEAR || — || align=right | 3.5 km || 
|-id=383 bgcolor=#E9E9E9
| 301383 ||  || — || February 19, 2009 || Kitt Peak || Spacewatch || — || align=right | 3.0 km || 
|-id=384 bgcolor=#E9E9E9
| 301384 ||  || — || February 19, 2009 || Catalina || CSS || — || align=right | 2.5 km || 
|-id=385 bgcolor=#E9E9E9
| 301385 ||  || — || February 21, 2009 || Mayhill || A. Lowe || — || align=right | 1.7 km || 
|-id=386 bgcolor=#E9E9E9
| 301386 ||  || — || February 19, 2009 || Mount Lemmon || Mount Lemmon Survey || — || align=right | 2.1 km || 
|-id=387 bgcolor=#E9E9E9
| 301387 ||  || — || February 20, 2009 || Kitt Peak || Spacewatch || AGN || align=right | 1.1 km || 
|-id=388 bgcolor=#E9E9E9
| 301388 ||  || — || February 21, 2009 || Catalina || CSS || — || align=right | 1.4 km || 
|-id=389 bgcolor=#E9E9E9
| 301389 ||  || — || February 21, 2009 || Catalina || CSS || — || align=right | 1.5 km || 
|-id=390 bgcolor=#E9E9E9
| 301390 ||  || — || February 5, 2009 || Kitt Peak || Spacewatch || — || align=right | 1.4 km || 
|-id=391 bgcolor=#d6d6d6
| 301391 ||  || — || February 21, 2009 || Kitt Peak || Spacewatch || KOR || align=right | 1.8 km || 
|-id=392 bgcolor=#E9E9E9
| 301392 ||  || — || February 21, 2009 || Mount Lemmon || Mount Lemmon Survey || — || align=right | 1.7 km || 
|-id=393 bgcolor=#d6d6d6
| 301393 ||  || — || February 23, 2009 || Calar Alto || F. Hormuth || KOR || align=right | 1.6 km || 
|-id=394 bgcolor=#d6d6d6
| 301394 Bensheim ||  ||  || February 23, 2009 || Tzec Maun || E. Schwab || — || align=right | 3.3 km || 
|-id=395 bgcolor=#d6d6d6
| 301395 ||  || — || February 19, 2009 || Kitt Peak || Spacewatch || — || align=right | 2.6 km || 
|-id=396 bgcolor=#E9E9E9
| 301396 ||  || — || February 20, 2009 || Kitt Peak || Spacewatch || — || align=right | 2.5 km || 
|-id=397 bgcolor=#E9E9E9
| 301397 ||  || — || February 20, 2009 || Kitt Peak || Spacewatch || — || align=right | 1.8 km || 
|-id=398 bgcolor=#d6d6d6
| 301398 ||  || — || February 20, 2009 || Kitt Peak || Spacewatch || — || align=right | 3.4 km || 
|-id=399 bgcolor=#E9E9E9
| 301399 ||  || — || February 20, 2009 || Kitt Peak || Spacewatch || — || align=right | 2.9 km || 
|-id=400 bgcolor=#d6d6d6
| 301400 ||  || — || February 20, 2009 || Kitt Peak || Spacewatch || KAR || align=right | 1.4 km || 
|}

301401–301500 

|-bgcolor=#d6d6d6
| 301401 ||  || — || February 20, 2009 || Kitt Peak || Spacewatch || — || align=right | 3.2 km || 
|-id=402 bgcolor=#d6d6d6
| 301402 ||  || — || February 20, 2009 || Kitt Peak || Spacewatch || — || align=right | 3.7 km || 
|-id=403 bgcolor=#d6d6d6
| 301403 ||  || — || February 20, 2009 || Kitt Peak || Spacewatch || KOR || align=right | 1.5 km || 
|-id=404 bgcolor=#d6d6d6
| 301404 ||  || — || February 20, 2009 || Kitt Peak || Spacewatch || EOS || align=right | 2.2 km || 
|-id=405 bgcolor=#E9E9E9
| 301405 ||  || — || February 23, 2009 || Calar Alto || F. Hormuth || — || align=right | 1.0 km || 
|-id=406 bgcolor=#fefefe
| 301406 ||  || — || February 19, 2009 || Dauban || F. Kugel || V || align=right data-sort-value="0.65" | 650 m || 
|-id=407 bgcolor=#d6d6d6
| 301407 ||  || — || February 17, 2009 || La Sagra || OAM Obs. || EOS || align=right | 2.5 km || 
|-id=408 bgcolor=#d6d6d6
| 301408 ||  || — || February 19, 2009 || La Sagra || OAM Obs. || — || align=right | 4.6 km || 
|-id=409 bgcolor=#d6d6d6
| 301409 ||  || — || February 19, 2009 || La Sagra || OAM Obs. || EOS || align=right | 2.5 km || 
|-id=410 bgcolor=#fefefe
| 301410 ||  || — || February 19, 2009 || La Sagra || OAM Obs. || — || align=right | 1.0 km || 
|-id=411 bgcolor=#E9E9E9
| 301411 ||  || — || February 22, 2009 || Socorro || LINEAR || — || align=right | 1.3 km || 
|-id=412 bgcolor=#fefefe
| 301412 ||  || — || February 28, 2009 || Wildberg || R. Apitzsch || — || align=right | 1.6 km || 
|-id=413 bgcolor=#E9E9E9
| 301413 ||  || — || February 27, 2009 || Vicques || M. Ory || AGN || align=right | 1.4 km || 
|-id=414 bgcolor=#fefefe
| 301414 ||  || — || February 26, 2009 || Socorro || LINEAR || — || align=right | 1.5 km || 
|-id=415 bgcolor=#fefefe
| 301415 ||  || — || February 19, 2009 || Kitt Peak || Spacewatch || — || align=right data-sort-value="0.99" | 990 m || 
|-id=416 bgcolor=#d6d6d6
| 301416 ||  || — || February 19, 2009 || Kitt Peak || Spacewatch || — || align=right | 3.1 km || 
|-id=417 bgcolor=#E9E9E9
| 301417 ||  || — || February 19, 2009 || Kitt Peak || Spacewatch || — || align=right | 2.2 km || 
|-id=418 bgcolor=#E9E9E9
| 301418 ||  || — || February 19, 2009 || Kitt Peak || Spacewatch || HOF || align=right | 3.0 km || 
|-id=419 bgcolor=#E9E9E9
| 301419 ||  || — || February 19, 2009 || Kitt Peak || Spacewatch || — || align=right | 1.6 km || 
|-id=420 bgcolor=#d6d6d6
| 301420 ||  || — || February 20, 2009 || Kitt Peak || Spacewatch || HYG || align=right | 2.6 km || 
|-id=421 bgcolor=#d6d6d6
| 301421 ||  || — || February 22, 2009 || Kitt Peak || Spacewatch || — || align=right | 3.4 km || 
|-id=422 bgcolor=#d6d6d6
| 301422 ||  || — || February 22, 2009 || Kitt Peak || Spacewatch || — || align=right | 2.6 km || 
|-id=423 bgcolor=#E9E9E9
| 301423 ||  || — || February 22, 2009 || Kitt Peak || Spacewatch || HEN || align=right | 1.1 km || 
|-id=424 bgcolor=#d6d6d6
| 301424 ||  || — || February 22, 2009 || Kitt Peak || Spacewatch || HYG || align=right | 3.5 km || 
|-id=425 bgcolor=#E9E9E9
| 301425 ||  || — || February 22, 2009 || Kitt Peak || Spacewatch || HOF || align=right | 3.3 km || 
|-id=426 bgcolor=#d6d6d6
| 301426 ||  || — || February 22, 2009 || Kitt Peak || Spacewatch || KOR || align=right | 1.9 km || 
|-id=427 bgcolor=#E9E9E9
| 301427 ||  || — || February 22, 2009 || Kitt Peak || Spacewatch || HOF || align=right | 3.5 km || 
|-id=428 bgcolor=#E9E9E9
| 301428 ||  || — || February 22, 2009 || Kitt Peak || Spacewatch || — || align=right | 2.4 km || 
|-id=429 bgcolor=#E9E9E9
| 301429 ||  || — || February 22, 2009 || Kitt Peak || Spacewatch || — || align=right | 1.3 km || 
|-id=430 bgcolor=#E9E9E9
| 301430 ||  || — || February 22, 2009 || Kitt Peak || Spacewatch || — || align=right | 1.2 km || 
|-id=431 bgcolor=#E9E9E9
| 301431 ||  || — || February 22, 2009 || Mount Lemmon || Mount Lemmon Survey || — || align=right | 1.8 km || 
|-id=432 bgcolor=#d6d6d6
| 301432 ||  || — || February 22, 2009 || Kitt Peak || Spacewatch || — || align=right | 3.7 km || 
|-id=433 bgcolor=#E9E9E9
| 301433 ||  || — || February 26, 2009 || Catalina || CSS || WIT || align=right | 1.3 km || 
|-id=434 bgcolor=#fefefe
| 301434 ||  || — || February 22, 2009 || Kitt Peak || Spacewatch || — || align=right data-sort-value="0.97" | 970 m || 
|-id=435 bgcolor=#fefefe
| 301435 ||  || — || February 25, 2009 || Calar Alto || F. Hormuth || — || align=right data-sort-value="0.78" | 780 m || 
|-id=436 bgcolor=#E9E9E9
| 301436 ||  || — || February 26, 2009 || Catalina || CSS || — || align=right | 1.7 km || 
|-id=437 bgcolor=#E9E9E9
| 301437 ||  || — || February 26, 2009 || Catalina || CSS || — || align=right | 1.1 km || 
|-id=438 bgcolor=#d6d6d6
| 301438 ||  || — || February 21, 2009 || La Sagra || OAM Obs. || EUP || align=right | 5.9 km || 
|-id=439 bgcolor=#E9E9E9
| 301439 ||  || — || February 25, 2009 || Catalina || CSS || PAD || align=right | 2.2 km || 
|-id=440 bgcolor=#d6d6d6
| 301440 ||  || — || August 21, 2006 || Kitt Peak || Spacewatch || KAR || align=right | 1.5 km || 
|-id=441 bgcolor=#d6d6d6
| 301441 ||  || — || February 21, 2009 || Kitt Peak || Spacewatch || — || align=right | 3.3 km || 
|-id=442 bgcolor=#E9E9E9
| 301442 ||  || — || February 24, 2009 || Kitt Peak || Spacewatch || — || align=right | 2.4 km || 
|-id=443 bgcolor=#E9E9E9
| 301443 ||  || — || February 24, 2009 || Kitt Peak || Spacewatch || AGN || align=right | 1.5 km || 
|-id=444 bgcolor=#d6d6d6
| 301444 ||  || — || February 24, 2009 || Kitt Peak || Spacewatch || — || align=right | 3.4 km || 
|-id=445 bgcolor=#E9E9E9
| 301445 ||  || — || February 24, 2009 || Kitt Peak || Spacewatch || — || align=right | 2.6 km || 
|-id=446 bgcolor=#E9E9E9
| 301446 ||  || — || February 24, 2009 || Kitt Peak || Spacewatch || — || align=right | 2.9 km || 
|-id=447 bgcolor=#E9E9E9
| 301447 ||  || — || February 24, 2009 || Kitt Peak || Spacewatch || PAD || align=right | 2.1 km || 
|-id=448 bgcolor=#E9E9E9
| 301448 ||  || — || February 27, 2009 || Kitt Peak || Spacewatch || HEN || align=right | 1.2 km || 
|-id=449 bgcolor=#fefefe
| 301449 ||  || — || February 27, 2009 || Kitt Peak || Spacewatch || — || align=right | 1.1 km || 
|-id=450 bgcolor=#E9E9E9
| 301450 ||  || — || February 28, 2009 || Kitt Peak || Spacewatch || WIT || align=right | 1.2 km || 
|-id=451 bgcolor=#E9E9E9
| 301451 ||  || — || February 26, 2009 || Kitt Peak || Spacewatch || — || align=right | 1.2 km || 
|-id=452 bgcolor=#E9E9E9
| 301452 ||  || — || February 26, 2009 || Kitt Peak || Spacewatch || — || align=right | 3.4 km || 
|-id=453 bgcolor=#d6d6d6
| 301453 ||  || — || February 26, 2009 || Kitt Peak || Spacewatch || KOR || align=right | 1.7 km || 
|-id=454 bgcolor=#E9E9E9
| 301454 ||  || — || February 26, 2009 || Catalina || CSS || ADE || align=right | 1.6 km || 
|-id=455 bgcolor=#d6d6d6
| 301455 ||  || — || February 27, 2009 || Catalina || CSS || — || align=right | 4.0 km || 
|-id=456 bgcolor=#E9E9E9
| 301456 ||  || — || February 27, 2009 || Catalina || CSS || HOF || align=right | 2.8 km || 
|-id=457 bgcolor=#E9E9E9
| 301457 ||  || — || February 27, 2009 || Mount Lemmon || Mount Lemmon Survey || — || align=right | 1.4 km || 
|-id=458 bgcolor=#E9E9E9
| 301458 ||  || — || February 26, 2009 || Catalina || CSS || HOF || align=right | 2.9 km || 
|-id=459 bgcolor=#E9E9E9
| 301459 ||  || — || February 27, 2009 || Kitt Peak || Spacewatch || HEN || align=right | 1.0 km || 
|-id=460 bgcolor=#E9E9E9
| 301460 ||  || — || February 27, 2009 || Kitt Peak || Spacewatch || WIT || align=right | 1.4 km || 
|-id=461 bgcolor=#E9E9E9
| 301461 ||  || — || February 27, 2009 || Kitt Peak || Spacewatch || — || align=right | 1.8 km || 
|-id=462 bgcolor=#d6d6d6
| 301462 ||  || — || February 27, 2009 || Kitt Peak || Spacewatch || — || align=right | 2.9 km || 
|-id=463 bgcolor=#E9E9E9
| 301463 ||  || — || February 27, 2009 || Kitt Peak || Spacewatch || — || align=right | 2.1 km || 
|-id=464 bgcolor=#E9E9E9
| 301464 ||  || — || February 27, 2009 || Kitt Peak || Spacewatch || AST || align=right | 2.0 km || 
|-id=465 bgcolor=#E9E9E9
| 301465 ||  || — || February 27, 2009 || Kitt Peak || Spacewatch || — || align=right | 1.3 km || 
|-id=466 bgcolor=#E9E9E9
| 301466 ||  || — || February 19, 2009 || Catalina || CSS || — || align=right | 2.5 km || 
|-id=467 bgcolor=#d6d6d6
| 301467 ||  || — || February 19, 2009 || Kitt Peak || Spacewatch || — || align=right | 3.4 km || 
|-id=468 bgcolor=#E9E9E9
| 301468 ||  || — || February 19, 2009 || Kitt Peak || Spacewatch || — || align=right | 1.5 km || 
|-id=469 bgcolor=#E9E9E9
| 301469 ||  || — || February 19, 2009 || Kitt Peak || Spacewatch || — || align=right | 2.0 km || 
|-id=470 bgcolor=#E9E9E9
| 301470 ||  || — || February 20, 2009 || Kitt Peak || Spacewatch || — || align=right | 1.4 km || 
|-id=471 bgcolor=#E9E9E9
| 301471 ||  || — || February 20, 2009 || Kitt Peak || Spacewatch || AGN || align=right | 1.4 km || 
|-id=472 bgcolor=#d6d6d6
| 301472 ||  || — || February 20, 2009 || Kitt Peak || Spacewatch || — || align=right | 2.8 km || 
|-id=473 bgcolor=#E9E9E9
| 301473 ||  || — || February 20, 2009 || Kitt Peak || Spacewatch || — || align=right | 1.8 km || 
|-id=474 bgcolor=#E9E9E9
| 301474 ||  || — || February 21, 2009 || Kitt Peak || Spacewatch || — || align=right | 2.9 km || 
|-id=475 bgcolor=#d6d6d6
| 301475 ||  || — || February 22, 2009 || Catalina || CSS || — || align=right | 4.7 km || 
|-id=476 bgcolor=#E9E9E9
| 301476 ||  || — || February 24, 2009 || Catalina || CSS || ADE || align=right | 3.2 km || 
|-id=477 bgcolor=#E9E9E9
| 301477 ||  || — || February 24, 2009 || Catalina || CSS || — || align=right | 1.8 km || 
|-id=478 bgcolor=#E9E9E9
| 301478 ||  || — || February 19, 2009 || Kitt Peak || Spacewatch || HEN || align=right data-sort-value="0.95" | 950 m || 
|-id=479 bgcolor=#d6d6d6
| 301479 ||  || — || February 21, 2009 || Kitt Peak || Spacewatch || EOS || align=right | 3.5 km || 
|-id=480 bgcolor=#E9E9E9
| 301480 ||  || — || February 27, 2009 || Kitt Peak || Spacewatch || — || align=right | 2.7 km || 
|-id=481 bgcolor=#d6d6d6
| 301481 ||  || — || February 28, 2009 || Kitt Peak || Spacewatch || — || align=right | 2.7 km || 
|-id=482 bgcolor=#E9E9E9
| 301482 ||  || — || February 28, 2009 || Kitt Peak || Spacewatch || — || align=right | 1.7 km || 
|-id=483 bgcolor=#E9E9E9
| 301483 ||  || — || February 20, 2009 || Kitt Peak || Spacewatch || — || align=right | 3.2 km || 
|-id=484 bgcolor=#d6d6d6
| 301484 ||  || — || February 24, 2009 || Mount Lemmon || Mount Lemmon Survey || — || align=right | 3.4 km || 
|-id=485 bgcolor=#E9E9E9
| 301485 ||  || — || February 19, 2009 || Kitt Peak || Spacewatch || — || align=right | 2.4 km || 
|-id=486 bgcolor=#d6d6d6
| 301486 ||  || — || February 26, 2009 || Kitt Peak || Spacewatch || — || align=right | 3.6 km || 
|-id=487 bgcolor=#E9E9E9
| 301487 ||  || — || February 16, 2009 || Catalina || CSS || MRX || align=right | 1.3 km || 
|-id=488 bgcolor=#E9E9E9
| 301488 ||  || — || February 21, 2009 || Socorro || LINEAR || — || align=right | 2.1 km || 
|-id=489 bgcolor=#E9E9E9
| 301489 ||  || — || February 18, 2009 || Socorro || LINEAR || XIZ || align=right | 1.7 km || 
|-id=490 bgcolor=#d6d6d6
| 301490 ||  || — || February 25, 2009 || Siding Spring || SSS || — || align=right | 4.6 km || 
|-id=491 bgcolor=#fefefe
| 301491 ||  || — || March 14, 2009 || La Sagra || OAM Obs. || V || align=right | 1.0 km || 
|-id=492 bgcolor=#E9E9E9
| 301492 ||  || — || March 15, 2009 || La Sagra || OAM Obs. || MAR || align=right | 1.6 km || 
|-id=493 bgcolor=#E9E9E9
| 301493 ||  || — || March 15, 2009 || La Sagra || OAM Obs. || HNA || align=right | 2.7 km || 
|-id=494 bgcolor=#d6d6d6
| 301494 ||  || — || March 15, 2009 || Kitt Peak || Spacewatch || — || align=right | 2.4 km || 
|-id=495 bgcolor=#d6d6d6
| 301495 ||  || — || March 15, 2009 || Kitt Peak || Spacewatch || — || align=right | 2.3 km || 
|-id=496 bgcolor=#E9E9E9
| 301496 ||  || — || March 15, 2009 || Kitt Peak || Spacewatch || AGN || align=right | 1.6 km || 
|-id=497 bgcolor=#E9E9E9
| 301497 ||  || — || March 15, 2009 || Mount Lemmon || Mount Lemmon Survey || — || align=right | 1.9 km || 
|-id=498 bgcolor=#E9E9E9
| 301498 ||  || — || March 15, 2009 || Catalina || CSS || — || align=right | 2.0 km || 
|-id=499 bgcolor=#E9E9E9
| 301499 ||  || — || March 14, 2009 || La Sagra || OAM Obs. || — || align=right | 2.2 km || 
|-id=500 bgcolor=#d6d6d6
| 301500 ||  || — || March 2, 2009 || Kitt Peak || Spacewatch || KOR || align=right | 1.7 km || 
|}

301501–301600 

|-bgcolor=#d6d6d6
| 301501 ||  || — || March 2, 2009 || Mount Lemmon || Mount Lemmon Survey || — || align=right | 3.2 km || 
|-id=502 bgcolor=#d6d6d6
| 301502 ||  || — || March 3, 2009 || Mount Lemmon || Mount Lemmon Survey || EOS || align=right | 3.0 km || 
|-id=503 bgcolor=#d6d6d6
| 301503 ||  || — || March 3, 2009 || Catalina || CSS || — || align=right | 4.6 km || 
|-id=504 bgcolor=#d6d6d6
| 301504 ||  || — || March 8, 2009 || Mount Lemmon || Mount Lemmon Survey || — || align=right | 4.5 km || 
|-id=505 bgcolor=#d6d6d6
| 301505 ||  || — || March 8, 2009 || Mount Lemmon || Mount Lemmon Survey || HYG || align=right | 3.0 km || 
|-id=506 bgcolor=#d6d6d6
| 301506 ||  || — || March 3, 2009 || Mount Lemmon || Mount Lemmon Survey || THM || align=right | 3.1 km || 
|-id=507 bgcolor=#E9E9E9
| 301507 ||  || — || March 15, 2009 || La Sagra || OAM Obs. || — || align=right | 1.5 km || 
|-id=508 bgcolor=#d6d6d6
| 301508 ||  || — || March 1, 2009 || Mount Lemmon || Mount Lemmon Survey || — || align=right | 3.9 km || 
|-id=509 bgcolor=#d6d6d6
| 301509 ||  || — || March 1, 2009 || Kitt Peak || Spacewatch || — || align=right | 2.9 km || 
|-id=510 bgcolor=#d6d6d6
| 301510 ||  || — || March 18, 2009 || Dauban || F. Kugel || EOS || align=right | 2.6 km || 
|-id=511 bgcolor=#d6d6d6
| 301511 Hubinon ||  ||  || March 19, 2009 || Saint-Sulpice || B. Christophe || — || align=right | 3.5 km || 
|-id=512 bgcolor=#d6d6d6
| 301512 ||  || — || March 16, 2009 || Kitt Peak || Spacewatch || 629 || align=right | 2.1 km || 
|-id=513 bgcolor=#d6d6d6
| 301513 ||  || — || March 16, 2009 || Kitt Peak || Spacewatch || — || align=right | 3.3 km || 
|-id=514 bgcolor=#d6d6d6
| 301514 ||  || — || March 16, 2009 || Kitt Peak || Spacewatch || — || align=right | 3.0 km || 
|-id=515 bgcolor=#E9E9E9
| 301515 ||  || — || March 18, 2009 || Mount Lemmon || Mount Lemmon Survey || — || align=right | 2.3 km || 
|-id=516 bgcolor=#E9E9E9
| 301516 ||  || — || March 17, 2009 || Kitt Peak || Spacewatch || HEN || align=right | 1.2 km || 
|-id=517 bgcolor=#E9E9E9
| 301517 ||  || — || March 16, 2009 || Dauban || F. Kugel || VIB || align=right | 2.4 km || 
|-id=518 bgcolor=#E9E9E9
| 301518 ||  || — || March 18, 2009 || La Sagra || OAM Obs. || HOF || align=right | 3.5 km || 
|-id=519 bgcolor=#d6d6d6
| 301519 ||  || — || March 19, 2009 || La Sagra || OAM Obs. || — || align=right | 4.9 km || 
|-id=520 bgcolor=#d6d6d6
| 301520 ||  || — || March 21, 2009 || Dauban || F. Kugel || — || align=right | 3.6 km || 
|-id=521 bgcolor=#d6d6d6
| 301521 ||  || — || March 18, 2009 || Siding Spring || SSS || — || align=right | 5.3 km || 
|-id=522 bgcolor=#d6d6d6
| 301522 Chaykin ||  ||  || March 22, 2009 || Tzec Maun || L. Elenin || THM || align=right | 3.5 km || 
|-id=523 bgcolor=#d6d6d6
| 301523 ||  || — || March 18, 2009 || La Sagra || OAM Obs. || — || align=right | 3.2 km || 
|-id=524 bgcolor=#E9E9E9
| 301524 ||  || — || March 17, 2009 || Kitt Peak || Spacewatch || — || align=right data-sort-value="0.88" | 880 m || 
|-id=525 bgcolor=#d6d6d6
| 301525 ||  || — || March 21, 2009 || Mount Lemmon || Mount Lemmon Survey || KAR || align=right | 1.3 km || 
|-id=526 bgcolor=#E9E9E9
| 301526 ||  || — || March 20, 2009 || Bergisch Gladbac || W. Bickel || WIT || align=right data-sort-value="0.98" | 980 m || 
|-id=527 bgcolor=#E9E9E9
| 301527 ||  || — || March 25, 2009 || Purple Mountain || PMO NEO || — || align=right | 1.8 km || 
|-id=528 bgcolor=#E9E9E9
| 301528 ||  || — || March 24, 2009 || Mount Lemmon || Mount Lemmon Survey || — || align=right | 1.2 km || 
|-id=529 bgcolor=#E9E9E9
| 301529 ||  || — || March 26, 2009 || Kitt Peak || Spacewatch || RAF || align=right data-sort-value="0.90" | 900 m || 
|-id=530 bgcolor=#E9E9E9
| 301530 ||  || — || March 18, 2009 || La Sagra || OAM Obs. || HOF || align=right | 3.5 km || 
|-id=531 bgcolor=#d6d6d6
| 301531 ||  || — || March 23, 2009 || Mount Lemmon || Mount Lemmon Survey || — || align=right | 3.0 km || 
|-id=532 bgcolor=#d6d6d6
| 301532 ||  || — || March 16, 2009 || Mount Lemmon || Mount Lemmon Survey || — || align=right | 4.8 km || 
|-id=533 bgcolor=#E9E9E9
| 301533 ||  || — || March 20, 2009 || La Sagra || OAM Obs. || — || align=right data-sort-value="0.89" | 890 m || 
|-id=534 bgcolor=#d6d6d6
| 301534 ||  || — || March 30, 2009 || Bergisch Gladbac || W. Bickel || — || align=right | 3.9 km || 
|-id=535 bgcolor=#E9E9E9
| 301535 ||  || — || March 28, 2009 || Kitt Peak || Spacewatch || — || align=right | 2.4 km || 
|-id=536 bgcolor=#d6d6d6
| 301536 ||  || — || March 28, 2009 || Kitt Peak || Spacewatch || EUP || align=right | 5.8 km || 
|-id=537 bgcolor=#d6d6d6
| 301537 ||  || — || March 19, 2009 || Mount Lemmon || Mount Lemmon Survey || — || align=right | 3.7 km || 
|-id=538 bgcolor=#E9E9E9
| 301538 ||  || — || March 28, 2009 || Kitt Peak || Spacewatch || — || align=right | 3.0 km || 
|-id=539 bgcolor=#d6d6d6
| 301539 ||  || — || March 29, 2009 || Mount Lemmon || Mount Lemmon Survey || — || align=right | 2.8 km || 
|-id=540 bgcolor=#d6d6d6
| 301540 ||  || — || March 29, 2009 || Mount Lemmon || Mount Lemmon Survey || — || align=right | 6.0 km || 
|-id=541 bgcolor=#d6d6d6
| 301541 ||  || — || March 19, 2009 || Mount Lemmon || Mount Lemmon Survey || — || align=right | 3.5 km || 
|-id=542 bgcolor=#d6d6d6
| 301542 ||  || — || March 23, 2009 || Purple Mountain || PMO NEO || — || align=right | 3.9 km || 
|-id=543 bgcolor=#d6d6d6
| 301543 ||  || — || March 17, 2009 || Kitt Peak || Spacewatch || HYG || align=right | 3.9 km || 
|-id=544 bgcolor=#d6d6d6
| 301544 ||  || — || March 19, 2009 || Kitt Peak || Spacewatch || VER || align=right | 3.0 km || 
|-id=545 bgcolor=#d6d6d6
| 301545 ||  || — || March 16, 2009 || Kitt Peak || Spacewatch || KAR || align=right | 1.5 km || 
|-id=546 bgcolor=#d6d6d6
| 301546 ||  || — || March 16, 2009 || Kitt Peak || Spacewatch || URS || align=right | 5.6 km || 
|-id=547 bgcolor=#d6d6d6
| 301547 ||  || — || March 26, 2009 || Kitt Peak || Spacewatch || EOS || align=right | 1.7 km || 
|-id=548 bgcolor=#E9E9E9
| 301548 ||  || — || March 31, 2009 || Kitt Peak || Spacewatch || — || align=right | 1.5 km || 
|-id=549 bgcolor=#E9E9E9
| 301549 ||  || — || March 22, 2009 || Mount Lemmon || Mount Lemmon Survey || AGN || align=right | 1.9 km || 
|-id=550 bgcolor=#d6d6d6
| 301550 ||  || — || March 18, 2009 || Kitt Peak || Spacewatch || VER || align=right | 3.1 km || 
|-id=551 bgcolor=#E9E9E9
| 301551 ||  || — || April 5, 2009 || La Sagra || OAM Obs. || ADE || align=right | 3.7 km || 
|-id=552 bgcolor=#E9E9E9
| 301552 ||  || — || April 14, 2009 || Vicques || M. Ory || — || align=right | 3.0 km || 
|-id=553 bgcolor=#d6d6d6
| 301553 Ninaglebova ||  ||  || April 13, 2009 || Zelenchukskaya || T. V. Kryachko || — || align=right | 3.8 km || 
|-id=554 bgcolor=#d6d6d6
| 301554 ||  || — || April 2, 2009 || Mount Lemmon || Mount Lemmon Survey || — || align=right | 3.6 km || 
|-id=555 bgcolor=#d6d6d6
| 301555 ||  || — || April 16, 2009 || Catalina || CSS || — || align=right | 5.3 km || 
|-id=556 bgcolor=#E9E9E9
| 301556 ||  || — || April 17, 2009 || Catalina || CSS || EUN || align=right | 1.4 km || 
|-id=557 bgcolor=#E9E9E9
| 301557 ||  || — || April 16, 2009 || Catalina || CSS || — || align=right | 1.5 km || 
|-id=558 bgcolor=#d6d6d6
| 301558 ||  || — || April 17, 2009 || Kitt Peak || Spacewatch || EOS || align=right | 2.2 km || 
|-id=559 bgcolor=#d6d6d6
| 301559 ||  || — || April 17, 2009 || Mount Lemmon || Mount Lemmon Survey || — || align=right | 3.9 km || 
|-id=560 bgcolor=#d6d6d6
| 301560 ||  || — || April 18, 2009 || Kitt Peak || Spacewatch || HYG || align=right | 3.6 km || 
|-id=561 bgcolor=#d6d6d6
| 301561 ||  || — || April 18, 2009 || Kitt Peak || Spacewatch || — || align=right | 2.9 km || 
|-id=562 bgcolor=#d6d6d6
| 301562 ||  || — || April 19, 2009 || Sierra Stars || W. G. Dillon || — || align=right | 2.6 km || 
|-id=563 bgcolor=#d6d6d6
| 301563 ||  || — || April 17, 2009 || Kitt Peak || Spacewatch || ULA7:4 || align=right | 7.1 km || 
|-id=564 bgcolor=#d6d6d6
| 301564 ||  || — || April 19, 2009 || Kitt Peak || Spacewatch || — || align=right | 4.2 km || 
|-id=565 bgcolor=#d6d6d6
| 301565 ||  || — || April 19, 2009 || Mount Lemmon || Mount Lemmon Survey || — || align=right | 3.3 km || 
|-id=566 bgcolor=#E9E9E9
| 301566 Melissajane ||  ||  || April 20, 2009 || Mayhill || N. Falla || — || align=right | 1.9 km || 
|-id=567 bgcolor=#d6d6d6
| 301567 ||  || — || April 20, 2009 || La Sagra || OAM Obs. || — || align=right | 3.5 km || 
|-id=568 bgcolor=#d6d6d6
| 301568 ||  || — || April 18, 2009 || Kitt Peak || Spacewatch || ULA7:4 || align=right | 5.9 km || 
|-id=569 bgcolor=#d6d6d6
| 301569 ||  || — || April 22, 2009 || Mount Lemmon || Mount Lemmon Survey || — || align=right | 2.9 km || 
|-id=570 bgcolor=#d6d6d6
| 301570 ||  || — || April 29, 2009 || Mount Lemmon || Mount Lemmon Survey || LIX || align=right | 3.8 km || 
|-id=571 bgcolor=#d6d6d6
| 301571 ||  || — || April 26, 2009 || Socorro || LINEAR || — || align=right | 4.3 km || 
|-id=572 bgcolor=#d6d6d6
| 301572 ||  || — || April 22, 2009 || Kitt Peak || Spacewatch || TIR || align=right | 3.3 km || 
|-id=573 bgcolor=#d6d6d6
| 301573 ||  || — || April 22, 2009 || Mount Lemmon || Mount Lemmon Survey || HYG || align=right | 3.3 km || 
|-id=574 bgcolor=#d6d6d6
| 301574 ||  || — || May 3, 2009 || Kitt Peak || Spacewatch || — || align=right | 3.3 km || 
|-id=575 bgcolor=#d6d6d6
| 301575 ||  || — || May 17, 2009 || Kitt Peak || Spacewatch || — || align=right | 4.3 km || 
|-id=576 bgcolor=#d6d6d6
| 301576 ||  || — || May 25, 2009 || Kitt Peak || Spacewatch || — || align=right | 3.1 km || 
|-id=577 bgcolor=#d6d6d6
| 301577 ||  || — || May 26, 2009 || Kitt Peak || Spacewatch || SYL7:4 || align=right | 5.9 km || 
|-id=578 bgcolor=#E9E9E9
| 301578 ||  || — || September 10, 2009 || Hibiscus || N. Teamo || — || align=right | 2.4 km || 
|-id=579 bgcolor=#C2FFFF
| 301579 ||  || — || October 24, 2009 || Catalina || CSS || L4 || align=right | 12 km || 
|-id=580 bgcolor=#C2FFFF
| 301580 ||  || — || October 21, 2009 || Mount Lemmon || Mount Lemmon Survey || L4 || align=right | 11 km || 
|-id=581 bgcolor=#fefefe
| 301581 ||  || — || December 13, 2009 || Socorro || LINEAR || H || align=right | 1.1 km || 
|-id=582 bgcolor=#E9E9E9
| 301582 ||  || — || January 12, 2010 || WISE || WISE || — || align=right | 2.2 km || 
|-id=583 bgcolor=#FA8072
| 301583 ||  || — || January 19, 2010 || Siding Spring || SSS || PHO || align=right | 1.9 km || 
|-id=584 bgcolor=#E9E9E9
| 301584 ||  || — || January 17, 2010 || WISE || WISE || — || align=right | 2.4 km || 
|-id=585 bgcolor=#E9E9E9
| 301585 ||  || — || January 19, 2010 || WISE || WISE || ADE || align=right | 2.6 km || 
|-id=586 bgcolor=#d6d6d6
| 301586 ||  || — || January 20, 2010 || WISE || WISE || — || align=right | 4.3 km || 
|-id=587 bgcolor=#d6d6d6
| 301587 ||  || — || February 8, 2010 || WISE || WISE || — || align=right | 5.3 km || 
|-id=588 bgcolor=#d6d6d6
| 301588 ||  || — || February 11, 2010 || WISE || WISE || — || align=right | 5.3 km || 
|-id=589 bgcolor=#fefefe
| 301589 ||  || — || February 9, 2010 || Kitt Peak || Spacewatch || — || align=right | 1.5 km || 
|-id=590 bgcolor=#fefefe
| 301590 ||  || — || February 9, 2010 || Kitt Peak || Spacewatch || NYS || align=right | 1.5 km || 
|-id=591 bgcolor=#fefefe
| 301591 ||  || — || February 10, 2010 || Kitt Peak || Spacewatch || FLO || align=right data-sort-value="0.66" | 660 m || 
|-id=592 bgcolor=#E9E9E9
| 301592 ||  || — || March 4, 2005 || Kitt Peak || Spacewatch || — || align=right | 3.2 km || 
|-id=593 bgcolor=#E9E9E9
| 301593 ||  || — || February 12, 2010 || Socorro || LINEAR || — || align=right | 2.3 km || 
|-id=594 bgcolor=#fefefe
| 301594 ||  || — || April 25, 2000 || Anderson Mesa || LONEOS || — || align=right data-sort-value="0.96" | 960 m || 
|-id=595 bgcolor=#fefefe
| 301595 ||  || — || February 13, 2010 || Kitt Peak || Spacewatch || NYS || align=right data-sort-value="0.97" | 970 m || 
|-id=596 bgcolor=#fefefe
| 301596 ||  || — || February 13, 2010 || Mount Lemmon || Mount Lemmon Survey || — || align=right data-sort-value="0.77" | 770 m || 
|-id=597 bgcolor=#fefefe
| 301597 ||  || — || February 13, 2010 || Mount Lemmon || Mount Lemmon Survey || V || align=right data-sort-value="0.78" | 780 m || 
|-id=598 bgcolor=#fefefe
| 301598 ||  || — || February 14, 2010 || Kitt Peak || Spacewatch || V || align=right data-sort-value="0.75" | 750 m || 
|-id=599 bgcolor=#fefefe
| 301599 ||  || — || February 14, 2010 || Kitt Peak || Spacewatch || NYS || align=right data-sort-value="0.78" | 780 m || 
|-id=600 bgcolor=#fefefe
| 301600 ||  || — || February 15, 2010 || Mount Lemmon || Mount Lemmon Survey || EUT || align=right data-sort-value="0.63" | 630 m || 
|}

301601–301700 

|-bgcolor=#fefefe
| 301601 ||  || — || February 9, 2010 || Catalina || CSS || H || align=right data-sort-value="0.98" | 980 m || 
|-id=602 bgcolor=#fefefe
| 301602 ||  || — || February 13, 2010 || Kitt Peak || Spacewatch || — || align=right data-sort-value="0.71" | 710 m || 
|-id=603 bgcolor=#fefefe
| 301603 ||  || — || February 13, 2010 || Catalina || CSS || — || align=right | 1.1 km || 
|-id=604 bgcolor=#fefefe
| 301604 ||  || — || February 14, 2010 || Kitt Peak || Spacewatch || — || align=right | 2.0 km || 
|-id=605 bgcolor=#fefefe
| 301605 ||  || — || February 14, 2010 || Kitt Peak || Spacewatch || NYS || align=right data-sort-value="0.77" | 770 m || 
|-id=606 bgcolor=#fefefe
| 301606 ||  || — || February 14, 2010 || Kitt Peak || Spacewatch || — || align=right | 1.3 km || 
|-id=607 bgcolor=#fefefe
| 301607 ||  || — || February 14, 2010 || Kitt Peak || Spacewatch || — || align=right | 1.1 km || 
|-id=608 bgcolor=#fefefe
| 301608 ||  || — || February 13, 2010 || Socorro || LINEAR || KLI || align=right | 2.9 km || 
|-id=609 bgcolor=#d6d6d6
| 301609 ||  || — || February 7, 2010 || WISE || WISE || — || align=right | 3.0 km || 
|-id=610 bgcolor=#fefefe
| 301610 ||  || — || September 11, 2004 || Kitt Peak || Spacewatch || — || align=right data-sort-value="0.65" | 650 m || 
|-id=611 bgcolor=#E9E9E9
| 301611 ||  || — || February 16, 2010 || WISE || WISE || — || align=right | 2.9 km || 
|-id=612 bgcolor=#fefefe
| 301612 ||  || — || February 17, 2010 || Bergisch Gladbac || W. Bickel || H || align=right data-sort-value="0.97" | 970 m || 
|-id=613 bgcolor=#fefefe
| 301613 ||  || — || February 16, 2010 || Kitt Peak || Spacewatch || — || align=right data-sort-value="0.88" | 880 m || 
|-id=614 bgcolor=#fefefe
| 301614 ||  || — || February 16, 2010 || Kitt Peak || Spacewatch || FLO || align=right | 1.4 km || 
|-id=615 bgcolor=#E9E9E9
| 301615 ||  || — || February 17, 2010 || Kitt Peak || Spacewatch || EUN || align=right | 1.7 km || 
|-id=616 bgcolor=#d6d6d6
| 301616 ||  || — || February 22, 2010 || WISE || WISE || — || align=right | 2.8 km || 
|-id=617 bgcolor=#d6d6d6
| 301617 ||  || — || February 24, 2010 || WISE || WISE || ALA || align=right | 4.5 km || 
|-id=618 bgcolor=#fefefe
| 301618 ||  || — || February 18, 2010 || Kitt Peak || Spacewatch || — || align=right | 1.0 km || 
|-id=619 bgcolor=#fefefe
| 301619 ||  || — || February 17, 2010 || Kitt Peak || Spacewatch || — || align=right data-sort-value="0.89" | 890 m || 
|-id=620 bgcolor=#fefefe
| 301620 ||  || — || February 18, 2010 || Mount Lemmon || Mount Lemmon Survey || — || align=right data-sort-value="0.62" | 620 m || 
|-id=621 bgcolor=#fefefe
| 301621 ||  || — || February 19, 2010 || Catalina || CSS || — || align=right | 2.6 km || 
|-id=622 bgcolor=#fefefe
| 301622 ||  || — || February 16, 2010 || Haleakala || Pan-STARRS || FLO || align=right data-sort-value="0.68" | 680 m || 
|-id=623 bgcolor=#fefefe
| 301623 ||  || — || February 16, 2010 || Haleakala || Pan-STARRS || V || align=right | 1.0 km || 
|-id=624 bgcolor=#d6d6d6
| 301624 ||  || — || March 1, 2010 || WISE || WISE || — || align=right | 4.0 km || 
|-id=625 bgcolor=#fefefe
| 301625 ||  || — || March 9, 2010 || Taunus || E. Schwab, R. Kling || NYS || align=right data-sort-value="0.84" | 840 m || 
|-id=626 bgcolor=#d6d6d6
| 301626 ||  || — || March 11, 2010 || WISE || WISE || — || align=right | 3.7 km || 
|-id=627 bgcolor=#d6d6d6
| 301627 ||  || — || March 10, 2010 || WISE || WISE || — || align=right | 4.0 km || 
|-id=628 bgcolor=#fefefe
| 301628 ||  || — || March 4, 2010 || Kitt Peak || Spacewatch || — || align=right | 2.1 km || 
|-id=629 bgcolor=#fefefe
| 301629 ||  || — || March 4, 2010 || Kitt Peak || Spacewatch || NYS || align=right data-sort-value="0.67" | 670 m || 
|-id=630 bgcolor=#fefefe
| 301630 ||  || — || March 5, 2010 || Catalina || CSS || — || align=right | 1.5 km || 
|-id=631 bgcolor=#E9E9E9
| 301631 ||  || — || March 4, 2010 || Kitt Peak || Spacewatch || TIN || align=right | 2.7 km || 
|-id=632 bgcolor=#fefefe
| 301632 ||  || — || March 4, 2010 || Catalina || CSS || H || align=right data-sort-value="0.90" | 900 m || 
|-id=633 bgcolor=#fefefe
| 301633 ||  || — || March 10, 2010 || Jarnac || Jarnac Obs. || — || align=right | 1.2 km || 
|-id=634 bgcolor=#fefefe
| 301634 ||  || — || March 10, 2010 || La Sagra || OAM Obs. || — || align=right | 1.7 km || 
|-id=635 bgcolor=#fefefe
| 301635 ||  || — || March 12, 2010 || Catalina || CSS || NYS || align=right data-sort-value="0.76" | 760 m || 
|-id=636 bgcolor=#fefefe
| 301636 ||  || — || March 4, 2010 || Kitt Peak || Spacewatch || V || align=right data-sort-value="0.87" | 870 m || 
|-id=637 bgcolor=#fefefe
| 301637 ||  || — || March 12, 2010 || Dauban || F. Kugel || FLO || align=right | 1.6 km || 
|-id=638 bgcolor=#E9E9E9
| 301638 Kressin ||  ||  || March 14, 2010 || Sonoita || R. Kracht || — || align=right | 2.4 km || 
|-id=639 bgcolor=#E9E9E9
| 301639 ||  || — || May 23, 2006 || Mount Lemmon || Mount Lemmon Survey || — || align=right | 1.4 km || 
|-id=640 bgcolor=#fefefe
| 301640 ||  || — || March 12, 2010 || Catalina || CSS || — || align=right | 1.0 km || 
|-id=641 bgcolor=#E9E9E9
| 301641 ||  || — || March 12, 2010 || Catalina || CSS || CLO || align=right | 2.8 km || 
|-id=642 bgcolor=#fefefe
| 301642 ||  || — || March 13, 2010 || Kitt Peak || Spacewatch || MAS || align=right data-sort-value="0.81" | 810 m || 
|-id=643 bgcolor=#E9E9E9
| 301643 ||  || — || March 13, 2010 || Mount Lemmon || Mount Lemmon Survey || — || align=right | 2.5 km || 
|-id=644 bgcolor=#fefefe
| 301644 ||  || — || March 14, 2010 || Kitt Peak || Spacewatch || NYS || align=right data-sort-value="0.71" | 710 m || 
|-id=645 bgcolor=#fefefe
| 301645 ||  || — || October 10, 1994 || Kitt Peak || Spacewatch || — || align=right | 1.0 km || 
|-id=646 bgcolor=#fefefe
| 301646 ||  || — || March 15, 2010 || Kitt Peak || Spacewatch || — || align=right | 2.1 km || 
|-id=647 bgcolor=#fefefe
| 301647 ||  || — || March 12, 2010 || Kitt Peak || Spacewatch || — || align=right data-sort-value="0.95" | 950 m || 
|-id=648 bgcolor=#fefefe
| 301648 ||  || — || March 4, 2010 || Kitt Peak || Spacewatch || — || align=right | 1.6 km || 
|-id=649 bgcolor=#fefefe
| 301649 ||  || — || March 12, 2010 || Kitt Peak || Spacewatch || — || align=right data-sort-value="0.68" | 680 m || 
|-id=650 bgcolor=#E9E9E9
| 301650 ||  || — || March 12, 2010 || Kitt Peak || Spacewatch || — || align=right | 3.1 km || 
|-id=651 bgcolor=#fefefe
| 301651 ||  || — || March 4, 2010 || Kitt Peak || Spacewatch || — || align=right | 1.5 km || 
|-id=652 bgcolor=#fefefe
| 301652 ||  || — || March 4, 2010 || Kitt Peak || Spacewatch || — || align=right | 1.6 km || 
|-id=653 bgcolor=#fefefe
| 301653 ||  || — || March 12, 2010 || Mount Lemmon || Mount Lemmon Survey || H || align=right | 1.00 km || 
|-id=654 bgcolor=#fefefe
| 301654 ||  || — || March 15, 2010 || Kitt Peak || Spacewatch || NYS || align=right data-sort-value="0.72" | 720 m || 
|-id=655 bgcolor=#fefefe
| 301655 ||  || — || March 15, 2010 || Catalina || CSS || FLO || align=right data-sort-value="0.83" | 830 m || 
|-id=656 bgcolor=#fefefe
| 301656 ||  || — || March 12, 2010 || Kitt Peak || Spacewatch || — || align=right | 1.2 km || 
|-id=657 bgcolor=#fefefe
| 301657 ||  || — || March 12, 2010 || Kitt Peak || Spacewatch || — || align=right data-sort-value="0.97" | 970 m || 
|-id=658 bgcolor=#d6d6d6
| 301658 ||  || — || March 13, 2010 || Kitt Peak || Spacewatch || — || align=right | 2.4 km || 
|-id=659 bgcolor=#fefefe
| 301659 ||  || — || March 13, 2010 || Kitt Peak || Spacewatch || V || align=right data-sort-value="0.60" | 600 m || 
|-id=660 bgcolor=#fefefe
| 301660 ||  || — || March 13, 2010 || Kitt Peak || Spacewatch || V || align=right data-sort-value="0.72" | 720 m || 
|-id=661 bgcolor=#fefefe
| 301661 ||  || — || March 13, 2010 || Kitt Peak || Spacewatch || V || align=right data-sort-value="0.77" | 770 m || 
|-id=662 bgcolor=#fefefe
| 301662 ||  || — || March 15, 2010 || Kitt Peak || Spacewatch || NYS || align=right data-sort-value="0.64" | 640 m || 
|-id=663 bgcolor=#fefefe
| 301663 ||  || — || March 13, 2010 || Kitt Peak || Spacewatch || V || align=right | 1.0 km || 
|-id=664 bgcolor=#E9E9E9
| 301664 ||  || — || March 15, 2010 || Kitt Peak || Spacewatch || — || align=right | 3.2 km || 
|-id=665 bgcolor=#E9E9E9
| 301665 ||  || — || March 5, 2010 || Kitt Peak || Spacewatch || — || align=right | 2.2 km || 
|-id=666 bgcolor=#E9E9E9
| 301666 ||  || — || March 14, 2010 || Kitt Peak || Spacewatch || — || align=right | 1.1 km || 
|-id=667 bgcolor=#E9E9E9
| 301667 ||  || — || March 12, 2010 || Kitt Peak || Spacewatch || RAF || align=right | 1.3 km || 
|-id=668 bgcolor=#fefefe
| 301668 ||  || — || March 13, 2010 || Mount Lemmon || Mount Lemmon Survey || NYS || align=right | 2.4 km || 
|-id=669 bgcolor=#E9E9E9
| 301669 ||  || — || March 13, 2010 || Mount Lemmon || Mount Lemmon Survey || — || align=right | 1.6 km || 
|-id=670 bgcolor=#fefefe
| 301670 ||  || — || January 26, 2006 || Mount Lemmon || Mount Lemmon Survey || MAS || align=right data-sort-value="0.76" | 760 m || 
|-id=671 bgcolor=#E9E9E9
| 301671 ||  || — || March 16, 2010 || Kitt Peak || Spacewatch || — || align=right | 2.3 km || 
|-id=672 bgcolor=#fefefe
| 301672 ||  || — || March 16, 2010 || Kitt Peak || Spacewatch || — || align=right | 1.1 km || 
|-id=673 bgcolor=#fefefe
| 301673 ||  || — || March 16, 2010 || Kitt Peak || Spacewatch || MAS || align=right data-sort-value="0.86" | 860 m || 
|-id=674 bgcolor=#E9E9E9
| 301674 ||  || — || March 16, 2010 || Kitt Peak || Spacewatch || — || align=right | 2.3 km || 
|-id=675 bgcolor=#fefefe
| 301675 ||  || — || March 17, 2010 || Kitt Peak || Spacewatch || — || align=right data-sort-value="0.77" | 770 m || 
|-id=676 bgcolor=#fefefe
| 301676 ||  || — || March 18, 2010 || Kitt Peak || Spacewatch || — || align=right data-sort-value="0.82" | 820 m || 
|-id=677 bgcolor=#fefefe
| 301677 ||  || — || December 2, 2005 || Kitt Peak || Spacewatch || FLO || align=right data-sort-value="0.60" | 600 m || 
|-id=678 bgcolor=#E9E9E9
| 301678 ||  || — || October 1, 2003 || Kitt Peak || Spacewatch || — || align=right data-sort-value="0.98" | 980 m || 
|-id=679 bgcolor=#fefefe
| 301679 ||  || — || March 22, 2010 || ESA OGS || ESA OGS || NYS || align=right | 1.8 km || 
|-id=680 bgcolor=#fefefe
| 301680 ||  || — || March 21, 2010 || Kitt Peak || Spacewatch || V || align=right data-sort-value="0.66" | 660 m || 
|-id=681 bgcolor=#fefefe
| 301681 ||  || — || March 18, 2010 || Kitt Peak || Spacewatch || NYS || align=right data-sort-value="0.59" | 590 m || 
|-id=682 bgcolor=#fefefe
| 301682 ||  || — || March 16, 2010 || Mount Lemmon || Mount Lemmon Survey || — || align=right data-sort-value="0.89" | 890 m || 
|-id=683 bgcolor=#fefefe
| 301683 ||  || — || January 23, 2006 || Kitt Peak || Spacewatch || — || align=right | 1.1 km || 
|-id=684 bgcolor=#E9E9E9
| 301684 ||  || — || March 19, 2010 || Mount Lemmon || Mount Lemmon Survey || — || align=right | 1.8 km || 
|-id=685 bgcolor=#E9E9E9
| 301685 ||  || — || March 25, 2010 || Kitt Peak || Spacewatch || — || align=right | 2.3 km || 
|-id=686 bgcolor=#fefefe
| 301686 ||  || — || December 25, 2005 || Kitt Peak || Spacewatch || NYS || align=right data-sort-value="0.78" | 780 m || 
|-id=687 bgcolor=#d6d6d6
| 301687 ||  || — || March 26, 2010 || Kitt Peak || Spacewatch || — || align=right | 4.4 km || 
|-id=688 bgcolor=#fefefe
| 301688 ||  || — || March 21, 2010 || Kitt Peak || Spacewatch || — || align=right | 1.1 km || 
|-id=689 bgcolor=#d6d6d6
| 301689 ||  || — || March 19, 2010 || Kitt Peak || Spacewatch || — || align=right | 1.7 km || 
|-id=690 bgcolor=#fefefe
| 301690 ||  || — || March 18, 2010 || Mount Lemmon || Mount Lemmon Survey || CLA || align=right | 2.2 km || 
|-id=691 bgcolor=#fefefe
| 301691 ||  || — || March 25, 2010 || Mount Lemmon || Mount Lemmon Survey || — || align=right | 1.0 km || 
|-id=692 bgcolor=#fefefe
| 301692 ||  || — || August 13, 2007 || Anderson Mesa || LONEOS || — || align=right | 1.4 km || 
|-id=693 bgcolor=#E9E9E9
| 301693 ||  || — || March 17, 2010 || Catalina || CSS || — || align=right | 2.0 km || 
|-id=694 bgcolor=#fefefe
| 301694 ||  || — || March 16, 2010 || Mount Lemmon || Mount Lemmon Survey || — || align=right data-sort-value="0.84" | 840 m || 
|-id=695 bgcolor=#fefefe
| 301695 ||  || — || November 23, 1997 || Kitt Peak || Spacewatch || NYS || align=right data-sort-value="0.93" | 930 m || 
|-id=696 bgcolor=#fefefe
| 301696 ||  || — || March 19, 2010 || Kitt Peak || Spacewatch || — || align=right | 1.1 km || 
|-id=697 bgcolor=#E9E9E9
| 301697 ||  || — || April 5, 2010 || Kitt Peak || Spacewatch || — || align=right | 2.1 km || 
|-id=698 bgcolor=#E9E9E9
| 301698 ||  || — || April 8, 2010 || La Sagra || OAM Obs. || — || align=right | 2.9 km || 
|-id=699 bgcolor=#fefefe
| 301699 ||  || — || April 4, 2010 || Kitt Peak || Spacewatch || V || align=right data-sort-value="0.73" | 730 m || 
|-id=700 bgcolor=#E9E9E9
| 301700 ||  || — || April 4, 2010 || Kitt Peak || Spacewatch || — || align=right | 1.8 km || 
|}

301701–301800 

|-bgcolor=#fefefe
| 301701 ||  || — || April 4, 2010 || Kitt Peak || Spacewatch || — || align=right | 1.1 km || 
|-id=702 bgcolor=#fefefe
| 301702 ||  || — || July 8, 2003 || Palomar || NEAT || — || align=right | 1.0 km || 
|-id=703 bgcolor=#d6d6d6
| 301703 ||  || — || April 5, 2010 || Kitt Peak || Spacewatch || — || align=right | 2.6 km || 
|-id=704 bgcolor=#E9E9E9
| 301704 ||  || — || April 8, 2010 || La Sagra || OAM Obs. || JUN || align=right | 1.4 km || 
|-id=705 bgcolor=#fefefe
| 301705 ||  || — || April 8, 2010 || Kitt Peak || Spacewatch || NYS || align=right data-sort-value="0.63" | 630 m || 
|-id=706 bgcolor=#fefefe
| 301706 ||  || — || April 8, 2010 || Kitt Peak || Spacewatch || V || align=right data-sort-value="0.73" | 730 m || 
|-id=707 bgcolor=#fefefe
| 301707 ||  || — || April 8, 2010 || Purple Mountain || PMO NEO || — || align=right | 1.2 km || 
|-id=708 bgcolor=#fefefe
| 301708 ||  || — || April 4, 2010 || Catalina || CSS || V || align=right data-sort-value="0.73" | 730 m || 
|-id=709 bgcolor=#E9E9E9
| 301709 ||  || — || April 5, 2010 || Kitt Peak || Spacewatch || — || align=right | 2.5 km || 
|-id=710 bgcolor=#E9E9E9
| 301710 ||  || — || April 9, 2010 || Catalina || CSS || — || align=right | 2.6 km || 
|-id=711 bgcolor=#fefefe
| 301711 ||  || — || April 10, 2010 || Mount Lemmon || Mount Lemmon Survey || NYS || align=right | 1.6 km || 
|-id=712 bgcolor=#d6d6d6
| 301712 ||  || — || April 13, 2010 || WISE || WISE || — || align=right | 7.5 km || 
|-id=713 bgcolor=#E9E9E9
| 301713 ||  || — || April 6, 2010 || Kitt Peak || Spacewatch || NEM || align=right | 2.2 km || 
|-id=714 bgcolor=#E9E9E9
| 301714 ||  || — || April 6, 2010 || Kitt Peak || Spacewatch || — || align=right | 2.0 km || 
|-id=715 bgcolor=#E9E9E9
| 301715 ||  || — || April 4, 2010 || Kitt Peak || Spacewatch || — || align=right | 1.2 km || 
|-id=716 bgcolor=#fefefe
| 301716 ||  || — || April 4, 2010 || Kitt Peak || Spacewatch || — || align=right | 2.6 km || 
|-id=717 bgcolor=#E9E9E9
| 301717 ||  || — || April 6, 2010 || Kitt Peak || Spacewatch || ADE || align=right | 2.6 km || 
|-id=718 bgcolor=#E9E9E9
| 301718 ||  || — || September 12, 2007 || Mount Lemmon || Mount Lemmon Survey || — || align=right | 1.4 km || 
|-id=719 bgcolor=#fefefe
| 301719 ||  || — || April 7, 2010 || Kitt Peak || Spacewatch || SUL || align=right | 1.9 km || 
|-id=720 bgcolor=#fefefe
| 301720 ||  || — || April 7, 2010 || Kitt Peak || Spacewatch || — || align=right | 1.8 km || 
|-id=721 bgcolor=#fefefe
| 301721 ||  || — || April 8, 2010 || Kitt Peak || Spacewatch || — || align=right data-sort-value="0.94" | 940 m || 
|-id=722 bgcolor=#fefefe
| 301722 ||  || — || April 10, 2010 || Kitt Peak || Spacewatch || MAS || align=right data-sort-value="0.63" | 630 m || 
|-id=723 bgcolor=#fefefe
| 301723 ||  || — || April 10, 2010 || Kitt Peak || Spacewatch || — || align=right data-sort-value="0.85" | 850 m || 
|-id=724 bgcolor=#E9E9E9
| 301724 ||  || — || April 10, 2010 || Kitt Peak || Spacewatch || — || align=right | 1.0 km || 
|-id=725 bgcolor=#fefefe
| 301725 ||  || — || March 4, 2006 || Mount Lemmon || Mount Lemmon Survey || V || align=right data-sort-value="0.82" | 820 m || 
|-id=726 bgcolor=#E9E9E9
| 301726 ||  || — || April 10, 2010 || Kitt Peak || Spacewatch || — || align=right | 2.1 km || 
|-id=727 bgcolor=#E9E9E9
| 301727 ||  || — || April 11, 2010 || Kitt Peak || Spacewatch || EUN || align=right | 1.3 km || 
|-id=728 bgcolor=#E9E9E9
| 301728 ||  || — || April 11, 2010 || Kitt Peak || Spacewatch || KAZ || align=right | 1.3 km || 
|-id=729 bgcolor=#E9E9E9
| 301729 ||  || — || April 11, 2010 || Kitt Peak || Spacewatch || — || align=right | 2.2 km || 
|-id=730 bgcolor=#E9E9E9
| 301730 ||  || — || January 15, 2001 || Kitt Peak || Spacewatch || — || align=right | 1.0 km || 
|-id=731 bgcolor=#E9E9E9
| 301731 ||  || — || April 10, 2010 || Kitt Peak || Spacewatch || — || align=right | 1.7 km || 
|-id=732 bgcolor=#fefefe
| 301732 ||  || — || April 9, 2010 || Kitt Peak || Spacewatch || V || align=right data-sort-value="0.83" | 830 m || 
|-id=733 bgcolor=#E9E9E9
| 301733 ||  || — || March 13, 2002 || Palomar || NEAT || — || align=right | 1.3 km || 
|-id=734 bgcolor=#E9E9E9
| 301734 ||  || — || April 8, 2010 || La Sagra || OAM Obs. || BRG || align=right | 2.3 km || 
|-id=735 bgcolor=#E9E9E9
| 301735 ||  || — || October 21, 2003 || Kitt Peak || Spacewatch || — || align=right data-sort-value="0.98" | 980 m || 
|-id=736 bgcolor=#fefefe
| 301736 ||  || — || April 12, 2010 || Mount Lemmon || Mount Lemmon Survey || — || align=right data-sort-value="0.86" | 860 m || 
|-id=737 bgcolor=#fefefe
| 301737 ||  || — || April 4, 2010 || Kitt Peak || Spacewatch || FLO || align=right data-sort-value="0.73" | 730 m || 
|-id=738 bgcolor=#fefefe
| 301738 ||  || — || April 9, 2010 || Kitt Peak || Spacewatch || — || align=right data-sort-value="0.87" | 870 m || 
|-id=739 bgcolor=#d6d6d6
| 301739 ||  || — || April 11, 2010 || Mount Lemmon || Mount Lemmon Survey || — || align=right | 2.7 km || 
|-id=740 bgcolor=#E9E9E9
| 301740 ||  || — || April 12, 2010 || Kitt Peak || Spacewatch || GEF || align=right | 1.6 km || 
|-id=741 bgcolor=#E9E9E9
| 301741 ||  || — || April 8, 2010 || Catalina || CSS || — || align=right | 1.7 km || 
|-id=742 bgcolor=#E9E9E9
| 301742 ||  || — || April 9, 2010 || Catalina || CSS || — || align=right | 3.4 km || 
|-id=743 bgcolor=#E9E9E9
| 301743 ||  || — || April 14, 2010 || Mount Lemmon || Mount Lemmon Survey || GEF || align=right | 3.0 km || 
|-id=744 bgcolor=#d6d6d6
| 301744 ||  || — || April 26, 2010 || WISE || WISE || — || align=right | 5.8 km || 
|-id=745 bgcolor=#fefefe
| 301745 ||  || — || April 20, 2010 || Kitt Peak || Spacewatch || — || align=right | 1.5 km || 
|-id=746 bgcolor=#E9E9E9
| 301746 ||  || — || April 20, 2010 || Kitt Peak || Spacewatch || — || align=right | 2.3 km || 
|-id=747 bgcolor=#E9E9E9
| 301747 ||  || — || April 26, 2010 || Mount Lemmon || Mount Lemmon Survey || — || align=right | 1.2 km || 
|-id=748 bgcolor=#fefefe
| 301748 ||  || — || April 21, 2010 || Kitt Peak || Spacewatch || NYS || align=right data-sort-value="0.70" | 700 m || 
|-id=749 bgcolor=#d6d6d6
| 301749 ||  || — || April 25, 2010 || Kitt Peak || Spacewatch || BRA || align=right | 1.9 km || 
|-id=750 bgcolor=#d6d6d6
| 301750 ||  || — || April 20, 2010 || Bergisch Gladbac || W. Bickel || — || align=right | 3.6 km || 
|-id=751 bgcolor=#E9E9E9
| 301751 ||  || — || October 29, 1999 || Kitt Peak || Spacewatch || — || align=right | 1.0 km || 
|-id=752 bgcolor=#E9E9E9
| 301752 || 2010 JL || — || May 3, 2010 || Nogales || Tenagra II Obs. || — || align=right | 3.7 km || 
|-id=753 bgcolor=#C2FFFF
| 301753 ||  || — || February 25, 2006 || Kitt Peak || Spacewatch || L5 || align=right | 12 km || 
|-id=754 bgcolor=#E9E9E9
| 301754 ||  || — || May 3, 2010 || Kitt Peak || Spacewatch || INO || align=right | 1.2 km || 
|-id=755 bgcolor=#E9E9E9
| 301755 ||  || — || May 3, 2010 || Kitt Peak || Spacewatch || — || align=right data-sort-value="0.93" | 930 m || 
|-id=756 bgcolor=#fefefe
| 301756 ||  || — || May 4, 2010 || Catalina || CSS || — || align=right | 1.5 km || 
|-id=757 bgcolor=#E9E9E9
| 301757 ||  || — || May 4, 2010 || Catalina || CSS || — || align=right | 1.9 km || 
|-id=758 bgcolor=#E9E9E9
| 301758 ||  || — || May 4, 2010 || Catalina || CSS || — || align=right | 1.4 km || 
|-id=759 bgcolor=#fefefe
| 301759 ||  || — || February 27, 2006 || Kitt Peak || Spacewatch || NYS || align=right | 1.0 km || 
|-id=760 bgcolor=#C2FFFF
| 301760 ||  || — || February 17, 2007 || Mount Lemmon || Mount Lemmon Survey || L5 || align=right | 16 km || 
|-id=761 bgcolor=#E9E9E9
| 301761 ||  || — || May 3, 2010 || Kitt Peak || Spacewatch || — || align=right | 3.5 km || 
|-id=762 bgcolor=#E9E9E9
| 301762 ||  || — || May 3, 2010 || Kitt Peak || Spacewatch || EUN || align=right | 1.2 km || 
|-id=763 bgcolor=#E9E9E9
| 301763 ||  || — || May 4, 2010 || Siding Spring || SSS || — || align=right | 2.3 km || 
|-id=764 bgcolor=#E9E9E9
| 301764 ||  || — || May 6, 2010 || Mount Lemmon || Mount Lemmon Survey || — || align=right | 1.4 km || 
|-id=765 bgcolor=#E9E9E9
| 301765 ||  || — || May 7, 2010 || Kitt Peak || Spacewatch || — || align=right | 2.6 km || 
|-id=766 bgcolor=#d6d6d6
| 301766 ||  || — || September 5, 2000 || Kitt Peak || Spacewatch || — || align=right | 3.2 km || 
|-id=767 bgcolor=#E9E9E9
| 301767 ||  || — || May 8, 2010 || Mount Lemmon || Mount Lemmon Survey || — || align=right | 2.6 km || 
|-id=768 bgcolor=#d6d6d6
| 301768 ||  || — || April 18, 2005 || Kitt Peak || Spacewatch || — || align=right | 2.9 km || 
|-id=769 bgcolor=#d6d6d6
| 301769 ||  || — || May 3, 2010 || Kitt Peak || Spacewatch || — || align=right | 3.8 km || 
|-id=770 bgcolor=#E9E9E9
| 301770 ||  || — || May 12, 2010 || Calvin-Rehoboth || L. A. Molnar || MAR || align=right | 1.3 km || 
|-id=771 bgcolor=#E9E9E9
| 301771 ||  || — || May 6, 2006 || Kitt Peak || Spacewatch || — || align=right | 3.3 km || 
|-id=772 bgcolor=#d6d6d6
| 301772 ||  || — || May 12, 2010 || Mount Lemmon || Mount Lemmon Survey || — || align=right | 3.3 km || 
|-id=773 bgcolor=#E9E9E9
| 301773 ||  || — || May 12, 2010 || Mount Lemmon || Mount Lemmon Survey || GEF || align=right | 1.7 km || 
|-id=774 bgcolor=#d6d6d6
| 301774 ||  || — || May 12, 2010 || Mount Lemmon || Mount Lemmon Survey || BRA || align=right | 2.5 km || 
|-id=775 bgcolor=#E9E9E9
| 301775 ||  || — || May 13, 2010 || Kitt Peak || Spacewatch || — || align=right | 3.5 km || 
|-id=776 bgcolor=#E9E9E9
| 301776 ||  || — || May 13, 2010 || Kitt Peak || Spacewatch || — || align=right | 2.2 km || 
|-id=777 bgcolor=#d6d6d6
| 301777 ||  || — || May 5, 2010 || Mount Lemmon || Mount Lemmon Survey || — || align=right | 2.4 km || 
|-id=778 bgcolor=#fefefe
| 301778 ||  || — || March 11, 2002 || Palomar || NEAT || — || align=right | 1.3 km || 
|-id=779 bgcolor=#E9E9E9
| 301779 ||  || — || May 29, 2006 || Socorro || LINEAR || — || align=right | 1.6 km || 
|-id=780 bgcolor=#E9E9E9
| 301780 ||  || — || September 21, 2003 || Palomar || NEAT || — || align=right | 1.8 km || 
|-id=781 bgcolor=#E9E9E9
| 301781 ||  || — || October 11, 2007 || Kitt Peak || Spacewatch || — || align=right | 1.4 km || 
|-id=782 bgcolor=#E9E9E9
| 301782 ||  || — || May 11, 2010 || Mount Lemmon || Mount Lemmon Survey || HOF || align=right | 3.4 km || 
|-id=783 bgcolor=#d6d6d6
| 301783 ||  || — || May 11, 2010 || Mount Lemmon || Mount Lemmon Survey || TRE || align=right | 3.7 km || 
|-id=784 bgcolor=#d6d6d6
| 301784 ||  || — || May 10, 2005 || Kitt Peak || Spacewatch || CHA || align=right | 2.1 km || 
|-id=785 bgcolor=#E9E9E9
| 301785 ||  || — || February 19, 2001 || Socorro || LINEAR || — || align=right | 1.4 km || 
|-id=786 bgcolor=#fefefe
| 301786 ||  || — || May 16, 2010 || Nogales || Tenagra II Obs. || — || align=right | 1.3 km || 
|-id=787 bgcolor=#E9E9E9
| 301787 ||  || — || May 18, 2010 || Siding Spring || SSS || BRG || align=right | 2.6 km || 
|-id=788 bgcolor=#E9E9E9
| 301788 ||  || — || May 22, 2010 || Siding Spring || SSS || — || align=right | 1.4 km || 
|-id=789 bgcolor=#fefefe
| 301789 ||  || — || November 10, 2004 || Kitt Peak || Spacewatch || V || align=right data-sort-value="0.81" | 810 m || 
|-id=790 bgcolor=#E9E9E9
| 301790 ||  || — || June 4, 2010 || Nogales || Tenagra II Obs. || — || align=right | 1.6 km || 
|-id=791 bgcolor=#E9E9E9
| 301791 ||  || — || June 3, 2010 || Kitt Peak || Spacewatch || — || align=right | 1.7 km || 
|-id=792 bgcolor=#fefefe
| 301792 ||  || — || June 3, 2010 || Kitt Peak || Spacewatch || V || align=right data-sort-value="0.73" | 730 m || 
|-id=793 bgcolor=#E9E9E9
| 301793 ||  || — || June 3, 2010 || Kitt Peak || Spacewatch || — || align=right | 1.9 km || 
|-id=794 bgcolor=#d6d6d6
| 301794 Antoninkapustin ||  ||  || June 12, 2010 || Zelenchukskaya || T. V. Kryachko || EUP || align=right | 3.5 km || 
|-id=795 bgcolor=#E9E9E9
| 301795 ||  || — || January 15, 2005 || Socorro || LINEAR || — || align=right | 1.3 km || 
|-id=796 bgcolor=#d6d6d6
| 301796 ||  || — || July 21, 2010 || WISE || WISE || 7:4 || align=right | 5.1 km || 
|-id=797 bgcolor=#d6d6d6
| 301797 ||  || — || July 26, 2010 || WISE || WISE || — || align=right | 4.0 km || 
|-id=798 bgcolor=#E9E9E9
| 301798 ||  || — || July 26, 2010 || WISE || WISE || — || align=right | 1.8 km || 
|-id=799 bgcolor=#fefefe
| 301799 ||  || — || May 26, 2006 || Mount Lemmon || Mount Lemmon Survey || — || align=right data-sort-value="0.83" | 830 m || 
|-id=800 bgcolor=#E9E9E9
| 301800 ||  || — || December 24, 2006 || Kitt Peak || Spacewatch || — || align=right | 2.4 km || 
|}

301801–301900 

|-bgcolor=#fefefe
| 301801 ||  || — || March 13, 2004 || Palomar || NEAT || ERI || align=right | 2.0 km || 
|-id=802 bgcolor=#E9E9E9
| 301802 ||  || — || May 1, 2003 || Kitt Peak || Spacewatch || — || align=right | 1.8 km || 
|-id=803 bgcolor=#d6d6d6
| 301803 ||  || — || September 15, 2006 || Kitt Peak || Spacewatch || — || align=right | 3.9 km || 
|-id=804 bgcolor=#fefefe
| 301804 ||  || — || August 19, 2004 || Siding Spring || SSS || — || align=right data-sort-value="0.98" | 980 m || 
|-id=805 bgcolor=#fefefe
| 301805 ||  || — || October 15, 2001 || Palomar || NEAT || — || align=right data-sort-value="0.92" | 920 m || 
|-id=806 bgcolor=#fefefe
| 301806 ||  || — || September 27, 2000 || Socorro || LINEAR || — || align=right | 1.1 km || 
|-id=807 bgcolor=#E9E9E9
| 301807 ||  || — || October 11, 2007 || Catalina || CSS || — || align=right | 2.3 km || 
|-id=808 bgcolor=#d6d6d6
| 301808 ||  || — || March 8, 2005 || Mount Lemmon || Mount Lemmon Survey || YAK || align=right | 2.8 km || 
|-id=809 bgcolor=#fefefe
| 301809 ||  || — || November 11, 2004 || Kitt Peak || Spacewatch || — || align=right data-sort-value="0.92" | 920 m || 
|-id=810 bgcolor=#fefefe
| 301810 ||  || — || October 6, 2000 || Anderson Mesa || LONEOS || MAS || align=right data-sort-value="0.92" | 920 m || 
|-id=811 bgcolor=#fefefe
| 301811 ||  || — || September 23, 2008 || Kitt Peak || Spacewatch || FLO || align=right data-sort-value="0.59" | 590 m || 
|-id=812 bgcolor=#E9E9E9
| 301812 ||  || — || September 14, 2007 || Catalina || CSS || — || align=right | 2.0 km || 
|-id=813 bgcolor=#fefefe
| 301813 ||  || — || May 13, 2007 || Mount Lemmon || Mount Lemmon Survey || — || align=right | 1.1 km || 
|-id=814 bgcolor=#d6d6d6
| 301814 ||  || — || October 21, 2006 || Catalina || CSS || — || align=right | 4.9 km || 
|-id=815 bgcolor=#fefefe
| 301815 ||  || — || June 28, 2004 || Siding Spring || SSS || FLO || align=right | 1.0 km || 
|-id=816 bgcolor=#fefefe
| 301816 ||  || — || May 25, 2003 || Haleakala || NEAT || V || align=right | 1.1 km || 
|-id=817 bgcolor=#E9E9E9
| 301817 ||  || — || October 24, 2003 || Apache Point || SDSS || BRG || align=right | 1.2 km || 
|-id=818 bgcolor=#d6d6d6
| 301818 ||  || — || November 19, 2006 || Catalina || CSS || — || align=right | 4.3 km || 
|-id=819 bgcolor=#d6d6d6
| 301819 ||  || — || July 10, 2005 || Siding Spring || SSS || LIX || align=right | 5.0 km || 
|-id=820 bgcolor=#fefefe
| 301820 ||  || — || September 10, 2007 || Mount Lemmon || Mount Lemmon Survey || — || align=right | 1.0 km || 
|-id=821 bgcolor=#d6d6d6
| 301821 ||  || — || March 17, 2004 || Kitt Peak || Spacewatch || — || align=right | 3.0 km || 
|-id=822 bgcolor=#fefefe
| 301822 ||  || — || March 14, 2007 || Kitt Peak || Spacewatch || — || align=right | 2.0 km || 
|-id=823 bgcolor=#E9E9E9
| 301823 ||  || — || October 23, 2003 || Kitt Peak || Spacewatch || — || align=right data-sort-value="0.89" | 890 m || 
|-id=824 bgcolor=#d6d6d6
| 301824 ||  || — || September 15, 2006 || Kitt Peak || Spacewatch || — || align=right | 2.9 km || 
|-id=825 bgcolor=#E9E9E9
| 301825 ||  || — || September 18, 2003 || Kitt Peak || Spacewatch || — || align=right data-sort-value="0.83" | 830 m || 
|-id=826 bgcolor=#fefefe
| 301826 ||  || — || January 5, 2006 || Mount Lemmon || Mount Lemmon Survey || NYS || align=right | 1.1 km || 
|-id=827 bgcolor=#E9E9E9
| 301827 ||  || — || January 16, 2004 || Kitt Peak || Spacewatch || MRX || align=right | 1.4 km || 
|-id=828 bgcolor=#d6d6d6
| 301828 ||  || — || January 27, 2003 || Palomar || NEAT || — || align=right | 3.4 km || 
|-id=829 bgcolor=#E9E9E9
| 301829 ||  || — || January 7, 2006 || Mount Lemmon || Mount Lemmon Survey || — || align=right | 2.4 km || 
|-id=830 bgcolor=#fefefe
| 301830 ||  || — || December 20, 2004 || Mount Lemmon || Mount Lemmon Survey || NYS || align=right data-sort-value="0.66" | 660 m || 
|-id=831 bgcolor=#fefefe
| 301831 ||  || — || March 5, 2000 || Cerro Tololo || DLS || FLO || align=right data-sort-value="0.80" | 800 m || 
|-id=832 bgcolor=#fefefe
| 301832 ||  || — || August 23, 2004 || Kitt Peak || Spacewatch || — || align=right data-sort-value="0.94" | 940 m || 
|-id=833 bgcolor=#E9E9E9
| 301833 ||  || — || August 24, 2007 || Kitt Peak || Spacewatch || — || align=right | 1.0 km || 
|-id=834 bgcolor=#d6d6d6
| 301834 ||  || — || February 19, 2009 || Mount Lemmon || Mount Lemmon Survey || — || align=right | 3.9 km || 
|-id=835 bgcolor=#E9E9E9
| 301835 ||  || — || March 10, 2005 || Mount Lemmon || Mount Lemmon Survey || — || align=right | 5.6 km || 
|-id=836 bgcolor=#E9E9E9
| 301836 ||  || — || September 30, 2003 || Kitt Peak || Spacewatch || — || align=right | 1.5 km || 
|-id=837 bgcolor=#E9E9E9
| 301837 || 5581 P-L || — || October 22, 1960 || Palomar || PLS || — || align=right | 2.0 km || 
|-id=838 bgcolor=#d6d6d6
| 301838 || 6226 P-L || — || September 24, 1960 || Palomar || PLS || — || align=right | 4.4 km || 
|-id=839 bgcolor=#fefefe
| 301839 || 1488 T-2 || — || September 29, 1973 || Palomar || PLS || — || align=right data-sort-value="0.73" | 730 m || 
|-id=840 bgcolor=#d6d6d6
| 301840 || 4212 T-3 || — || October 16, 1977 || Palomar || PLS || — || align=right | 3.6 km || 
|-id=841 bgcolor=#E9E9E9
| 301841 || 4260 T-3 || — || October 16, 1977 || Palomar || PLS || EUN || align=right | 1.7 km || 
|-id=842 bgcolor=#FA8072
| 301842 ||  || — || March 16, 1980 || La Silla || C.-I. Lagerkvist || — || align=right | 9.0 km || 
|-id=843 bgcolor=#d6d6d6
| 301843 ||  || — || February 28, 1981 || Siding Spring || S. J. Bus || — || align=right | 4.1 km || 
|-id=844 bgcolor=#FFC2E0
| 301844 || 1990 UA || — || October 16, 1990 || Palomar || E. F. Helin || APOPHAcritical || align=right data-sort-value="0.4" | 400 m || 
|-id=845 bgcolor=#E9E9E9
| 301845 ||  || — || September 24, 1992 || Kitt Peak || Spacewatch || GEF || align=right | 1.3 km || 
|-id=846 bgcolor=#FA8072
| 301846 ||  || — || July 16, 1993 || Palomar || E. F. Helin, K. J. Lawrence || — || align=right | 1.1 km || 
|-id=847 bgcolor=#fefefe
| 301847 ||  || — || January 5, 1994 || Kitt Peak || Spacewatch || NYS || align=right data-sort-value="0.67" | 670 m || 
|-id=848 bgcolor=#d6d6d6
| 301848 ||  || — || August 10, 1994 || La Silla || E. W. Elst || — || align=right | 3.0 km || 
|-id=849 bgcolor=#fefefe
| 301849 ||  || — || September 28, 1994 || Kitt Peak || Spacewatch || FLO || align=right data-sort-value="0.69" | 690 m || 
|-id=850 bgcolor=#d6d6d6
| 301850 ||  || — || October 6, 1994 || Kitt Peak || Spacewatch || THM || align=right | 2.4 km || 
|-id=851 bgcolor=#E9E9E9
| 301851 ||  || — || October 28, 1994 || Kitt Peak || Spacewatch || — || align=right | 1.5 km || 
|-id=852 bgcolor=#E9E9E9
| 301852 ||  || — || November 26, 1994 || Kitt Peak || Spacewatch || — || align=right | 1.8 km || 
|-id=853 bgcolor=#E9E9E9
| 301853 ||  || — || November 26, 1994 || Kitt Peak || Spacewatch || — || align=right | 2.1 km || 
|-id=854 bgcolor=#fefefe
| 301854 ||  || — || January 31, 1995 || Kitt Peak || Spacewatch || — || align=right | 1.0 km || 
|-id=855 bgcolor=#fefefe
| 301855 ||  || — || February 7, 1995 || Siding Spring || R. H. McNaught || PHO || align=right | 1.6 km || 
|-id=856 bgcolor=#E9E9E9
| 301856 ||  || — || March 2, 1995 || Kitt Peak || Spacewatch || — || align=right | 2.1 km || 
|-id=857 bgcolor=#fefefe
| 301857 ||  || — || June 25, 1995 || Kitt Peak || Spacewatch || — || align=right | 1.2 km || 
|-id=858 bgcolor=#d6d6d6
| 301858 ||  || — || August 31, 1995 || Kitt Peak || Spacewatch || — || align=right | 2.7 km || 
|-id=859 bgcolor=#d6d6d6
| 301859 ||  || — || September 17, 1995 || Kitt Peak || Spacewatch || EOS || align=right | 2.6 km || 
|-id=860 bgcolor=#fefefe
| 301860 ||  || — || September 23, 1995 || Kitt Peak || Spacewatch || — || align=right data-sort-value="0.98" | 980 m || 
|-id=861 bgcolor=#d6d6d6
| 301861 ||  || — || September 26, 1995 || Kitt Peak || Spacewatch || — || align=right | 2.6 km || 
|-id=862 bgcolor=#d6d6d6
| 301862 ||  || — || September 25, 1995 || Kitt Peak || Spacewatch || — || align=right | 2.4 km || 
|-id=863 bgcolor=#d6d6d6
| 301863 ||  || — || September 18, 1995 || Kitt Peak || Spacewatch || — || align=right | 2.4 km || 
|-id=864 bgcolor=#d6d6d6
| 301864 ||  || — || September 26, 1995 || Kitt Peak || Spacewatch || 3:2 || align=right | 3.9 km || 
|-id=865 bgcolor=#d6d6d6
| 301865 ||  || — || September 26, 1995 || Kitt Peak || Spacewatch || — || align=right | 2.8 km || 
|-id=866 bgcolor=#d6d6d6
| 301866 ||  || — || October 1, 1995 || Kitt Peak || Spacewatch || — || align=right | 4.7 km || 
|-id=867 bgcolor=#d6d6d6
| 301867 ||  || — || October 18, 1995 || Kitt Peak || Spacewatch || ANF || align=right | 1.6 km || 
|-id=868 bgcolor=#d6d6d6
| 301868 ||  || — || October 18, 1995 || Kitt Peak || Spacewatch || 3:2 || align=right | 4.3 km || 
|-id=869 bgcolor=#d6d6d6
| 301869 ||  || — || November 14, 1995 || Kitt Peak || Spacewatch || — || align=right | 2.7 km || 
|-id=870 bgcolor=#d6d6d6
| 301870 ||  || — || November 16, 1995 || Kitt Peak || Spacewatch || SHU3:2 || align=right | 5.4 km || 
|-id=871 bgcolor=#d6d6d6
| 301871 ||  || — || November 17, 1995 || Kitt Peak || Spacewatch || — || align=right | 2.9 km || 
|-id=872 bgcolor=#E9E9E9
| 301872 ||  || — || November 17, 1995 || Kitt Peak || Spacewatch || — || align=right | 1.2 km || 
|-id=873 bgcolor=#d6d6d6
| 301873 ||  || — || November 18, 1995 || Kitt Peak || Spacewatch || — || align=right | 4.2 km || 
|-id=874 bgcolor=#d6d6d6
| 301874 ||  || — || November 23, 1995 || Kitt Peak || Spacewatch || EMA || align=right | 2.8 km || 
|-id=875 bgcolor=#E9E9E9
| 301875 ||  || — || January 24, 1996 || Kitt Peak || Spacewatch || — || align=right | 1.2 km || 
|-id=876 bgcolor=#E9E9E9
| 301876 ||  || — || March 11, 1996 || Kitt Peak || Spacewatch || — || align=right | 2.3 km || 
|-id=877 bgcolor=#fefefe
| 301877 ||  || — || May 13, 1996 || Kitt Peak || Spacewatch || — || align=right data-sort-value="0.99" | 990 m || 
|-id=878 bgcolor=#fefefe
| 301878 ||  || — || November 7, 1996 || Kitt Peak || Spacewatch || NYS || align=right data-sort-value="0.69" | 690 m || 
|-id=879 bgcolor=#d6d6d6
| 301879 ||  || — || April 30, 1997 || Socorro || LINEAR || — || align=right | 5.3 km || 
|-id=880 bgcolor=#d6d6d6
| 301880 ||  || — || April 29, 1997 || Kitt Peak || Spacewatch || — || align=right | 4.0 km || 
|-id=881 bgcolor=#E9E9E9
| 301881 ||  || — || October 4, 1997 || Kitt Peak || Spacewatch || — || align=right | 2.5 km || 
|-id=882 bgcolor=#fefefe
| 301882 ||  || — || January 18, 1998 || Kitt Peak || Spacewatch || NYS || align=right data-sort-value="0.66" | 660 m || 
|-id=883 bgcolor=#fefefe
| 301883 ||  || — || March 9, 1998 || Teide || Teide Obs. || — || align=right | 1.5 km || 
|-id=884 bgcolor=#d6d6d6
| 301884 ||  || — || May 23, 1998 || Kitt Peak || Spacewatch || ALA || align=right | 4.7 km || 
|-id=885 bgcolor=#E9E9E9
| 301885 ||  || — || August 17, 1998 || Socorro || LINEAR || — || align=right | 2.6 km || 
|-id=886 bgcolor=#E9E9E9
| 301886 ||  || — || August 22, 1998 || Xinglong || SCAP || — || align=right | 1.8 km || 
|-id=887 bgcolor=#E9E9E9
| 301887 ||  || — || August 17, 1998 || Socorro || LINEAR || — || align=right | 1.9 km || 
|-id=888 bgcolor=#E9E9E9
| 301888 ||  || — || August 26, 1998 || Kitt Peak || Spacewatch || — || align=right | 1.6 km || 
|-id=889 bgcolor=#E9E9E9
| 301889 ||  || — || August 24, 1998 || Socorro || LINEAR || EUN || align=right | 1.8 km || 
|-id=890 bgcolor=#E9E9E9
| 301890 ||  || — || August 17, 1998 || Socorro || LINEAR || — || align=right | 2.9 km || 
|-id=891 bgcolor=#E9E9E9
| 301891 ||  || — || August 19, 1998 || Socorro || LINEAR || — || align=right | 1.9 km || 
|-id=892 bgcolor=#E9E9E9
| 301892 ||  || — || August 28, 1998 || Socorro || LINEAR || — || align=right | 2.8 km || 
|-id=893 bgcolor=#E9E9E9
| 301893 ||  || — || September 14, 1998 || Kitt Peak || Spacewatch || — || align=right | 1.8 km || 
|-id=894 bgcolor=#FA8072
| 301894 ||  || — || September 14, 1998 || Socorro || LINEAR || — || align=right | 2.2 km || 
|-id=895 bgcolor=#E9E9E9
| 301895 ||  || — || September 14, 1998 || Socorro || LINEAR || — || align=right | 2.3 km || 
|-id=896 bgcolor=#E9E9E9
| 301896 ||  || — || September 16, 1998 || Kitt Peak || Spacewatch || — || align=right | 1.6 km || 
|-id=897 bgcolor=#E9E9E9
| 301897 ||  || — || September 22, 1998 || Caussols || ODAS || — || align=right | 2.4 km || 
|-id=898 bgcolor=#E9E9E9
| 301898 ||  || — || September 26, 1998 || Socorro || LINEAR || — || align=right | 2.2 km || 
|-id=899 bgcolor=#E9E9E9
| 301899 ||  || — || September 25, 1998 || Kitt Peak || Spacewatch || — || align=right | 1.6 km || 
|-id=900 bgcolor=#E9E9E9
| 301900 ||  || — || September 26, 1998 || Socorro || LINEAR || — || align=right | 1.7 km || 
|}

301901–302000 

|-bgcolor=#E9E9E9
| 301901 ||  || — || October 23, 1998 || Kitt Peak || Spacewatch || — || align=right | 1.9 km || 
|-id=902 bgcolor=#E9E9E9
| 301902 ||  || — || October 28, 1998 || Socorro || LINEAR || — || align=right | 2.2 km || 
|-id=903 bgcolor=#E9E9E9
| 301903 ||  || — || October 17, 1998 || Kitt Peak || Spacewatch || — || align=right | 1.9 km || 
|-id=904 bgcolor=#E9E9E9
| 301904 ||  || — || November 19, 1998 || Anderson Mesa || LONEOS || — || align=right | 2.0 km || 
|-id=905 bgcolor=#E9E9E9
| 301905 ||  || — || November 24, 1998 || Socorro || LINEAR || — || align=right | 2.5 km || 
|-id=906 bgcolor=#E9E9E9
| 301906 ||  || — || December 8, 1998 || Kitt Peak || Spacewatch || — || align=right | 2.7 km || 
|-id=907 bgcolor=#FA8072
| 301907 ||  || — || December 12, 1998 || Socorro || LINEAR || — || align=right | 3.4 km || 
|-id=908 bgcolor=#E9E9E9
| 301908 ||  || — || December 15, 1998 || Caussols || ODAS || — || align=right | 1.7 km || 
|-id=909 bgcolor=#E9E9E9
| 301909 ||  || — || December 15, 1998 || Caussols || ODAS || — || align=right | 1.5 km || 
|-id=910 bgcolor=#FA8072
| 301910 ||  || — || December 25, 1998 || Catalina || CSS || — || align=right | 4.6 km || 
|-id=911 bgcolor=#E9E9E9
| 301911 ||  || — || December 25, 1998 || Kitt Peak || Spacewatch || — || align=right | 1.3 km || 
|-id=912 bgcolor=#fefefe
| 301912 ||  || — || January 19, 1999 || Kitt Peak || Spacewatch || — || align=right data-sort-value="0.66" | 660 m || 
|-id=913 bgcolor=#d6d6d6
| 301913 ||  || — || March 20, 1999 || Apache Point || SDSS || — || align=right | 2.8 km || 
|-id=914 bgcolor=#fefefe
| 301914 ||  || — || May 13, 1999 || Socorro || LINEAR || — || align=right | 1.0 km || 
|-id=915 bgcolor=#fefefe
| 301915 ||  || — || June 5, 1999 || Kitt Peak || Spacewatch || V || align=right data-sort-value="0.86" | 860 m || 
|-id=916 bgcolor=#fefefe
| 301916 ||  || — || September 9, 1999 || Socorro || LINEAR || NYS || align=right data-sort-value="0.66" | 660 m || 
|-id=917 bgcolor=#FA8072
| 301917 ||  || — || September 18, 1999 || Kitt Peak || Spacewatch || — || align=right | 1.4 km || 
|-id=918 bgcolor=#d6d6d6
| 301918 ||  || — || October 8, 1999 || Kitt Peak || Spacewatch || — || align=right | 3.4 km || 
|-id=919 bgcolor=#E9E9E9
| 301919 ||  || — || October 12, 1999 || Socorro || LINEAR || — || align=right | 1.4 km || 
|-id=920 bgcolor=#E9E9E9
| 301920 ||  || — || November 9, 1999 || Socorro || LINEAR || — || align=right data-sort-value="0.82" | 820 m || 
|-id=921 bgcolor=#E9E9E9
| 301921 ||  || — || November 12, 1999 || Socorro || LINEAR || — || align=right | 1.4 km || 
|-id=922 bgcolor=#E9E9E9
| 301922 ||  || — || November 14, 1999 || Socorro || LINEAR || — || align=right | 1.9 km || 
|-id=923 bgcolor=#d6d6d6
| 301923 ||  || — || November 15, 1999 || Socorro || LINEAR || — || align=right | 4.9 km || 
|-id=924 bgcolor=#E9E9E9
| 301924 ||  || — || November 14, 1999 || Kitt Peak || Spacewatch || — || align=right | 1.1 km || 
|-id=925 bgcolor=#FA8072
| 301925 ||  || — || December 7, 1999 || Socorro || LINEAR || — || align=right | 3.0 km || 
|-id=926 bgcolor=#E9E9E9
| 301926 ||  || — || December 7, 1999 || Socorro || LINEAR || — || align=right | 3.2 km || 
|-id=927 bgcolor=#E9E9E9
| 301927 ||  || — || December 7, 1999 || Socorro || LINEAR || — || align=right | 4.4 km || 
|-id=928 bgcolor=#E9E9E9
| 301928 ||  || — || December 12, 1999 || Socorro || LINEAR || — || align=right | 1.5 km || 
|-id=929 bgcolor=#E9E9E9
| 301929 ||  || — || December 12, 1999 || Socorro || LINEAR || MAR || align=right | 1.5 km || 
|-id=930 bgcolor=#E9E9E9
| 301930 ||  || — || December 12, 1999 || Kitt Peak || Spacewatch || — || align=right | 1.3 km || 
|-id=931 bgcolor=#E9E9E9
| 301931 ||  || — || December 27, 1999 || Kitt Peak || Spacewatch || — || align=right | 1.6 km || 
|-id=932 bgcolor=#E9E9E9
| 301932 ||  || — || January 2, 2000 || Socorro || LINEAR || — || align=right | 3.9 km || 
|-id=933 bgcolor=#E9E9E9
| 301933 ||  || — || January 13, 2000 || Kitt Peak || Spacewatch || — || align=right | 1.1 km || 
|-id=934 bgcolor=#E9E9E9
| 301934 ||  || — || January 3, 2000 || Gnosca || S. Sposetti || — || align=right | 2.2 km || 
|-id=935 bgcolor=#E9E9E9
| 301935 ||  || — || January 4, 2000 || Socorro || LINEAR || — || align=right | 1.8 km || 
|-id=936 bgcolor=#FA8072
| 301936 ||  || — || January 4, 2000 || Socorro || LINEAR || — || align=right | 3.8 km || 
|-id=937 bgcolor=#E9E9E9
| 301937 ||  || — || January 5, 2000 || Socorro || LINEAR || BRG || align=right | 2.8 km || 
|-id=938 bgcolor=#E9E9E9
| 301938 ||  || — || January 3, 2000 || Socorro || LINEAR || — || align=right | 1.9 km || 
|-id=939 bgcolor=#E9E9E9
| 301939 ||  || — || January 4, 2000 || Socorro || LINEAR || — || align=right | 1.5 km || 
|-id=940 bgcolor=#E9E9E9
| 301940 ||  || — || January 6, 2000 || Kitt Peak || Spacewatch || EUN || align=right | 1.7 km || 
|-id=941 bgcolor=#E9E9E9
| 301941 ||  || — || January 8, 2000 || Kitt Peak || Spacewatch || — || align=right | 1.1 km || 
|-id=942 bgcolor=#E9E9E9
| 301942 ||  || — || January 5, 2000 || Socorro || LINEAR || — || align=right | 1.4 km || 
|-id=943 bgcolor=#E9E9E9
| 301943 ||  || — || January 5, 2000 || Socorro || LINEAR || — || align=right | 1.2 km || 
|-id=944 bgcolor=#C2FFFF
| 301944 ||  || — || January 3, 2000 || Kitt Peak || Spacewatch || L4 || align=right | 13 km || 
|-id=945 bgcolor=#E9E9E9
| 301945 ||  || — || January 31, 2000 || Oizumi || T. Kobayashi || slow || align=right | 2.4 km || 
|-id=946 bgcolor=#E9E9E9
| 301946 ||  || — || January 28, 2000 || Piszkéstető || K. Sárneczky, G. Szabó || — || align=right | 1.3 km || 
|-id=947 bgcolor=#E9E9E9
| 301947 ||  || — || February 2, 2000 || Socorro || LINEAR || — || align=right | 1.5 km || 
|-id=948 bgcolor=#E9E9E9
| 301948 ||  || — || February 2, 2000 || Socorro || LINEAR || — || align=right | 2.9 km || 
|-id=949 bgcolor=#E9E9E9
| 301949 ||  || — || February 3, 2000 || Ondřejov || P. Kušnirák || — || align=right | 1.4 km || 
|-id=950 bgcolor=#E9E9E9
| 301950 ||  || — || February 2, 2000 || Socorro || LINEAR || — || align=right | 1.6 km || 
|-id=951 bgcolor=#E9E9E9
| 301951 ||  || — || February 8, 2000 || Kitt Peak || Spacewatch || — || align=right | 1.4 km || 
|-id=952 bgcolor=#E9E9E9
| 301952 ||  || — || February 3, 2000 || Socorro || LINEAR || — || align=right | 1.8 km || 
|-id=953 bgcolor=#E9E9E9
| 301953 ||  || — || February 3, 2000 || Kitt Peak || Spacewatch || — || align=right | 2.0 km || 
|-id=954 bgcolor=#E9E9E9
| 301954 ||  || — || February 4, 2000 || Kitt Peak || Spacewatch || — || align=right | 1.5 km || 
|-id=955 bgcolor=#fefefe
| 301955 ||  || — || February 26, 2000 || Kitt Peak || Spacewatch || — || align=right | 1.1 km || 
|-id=956 bgcolor=#E9E9E9
| 301956 ||  || — || February 29, 2000 || Socorro || LINEAR || — || align=right | 1.7 km || 
|-id=957 bgcolor=#E9E9E9
| 301957 ||  || — || February 29, 2000 || Socorro || LINEAR || — || align=right | 2.4 km || 
|-id=958 bgcolor=#E9E9E9
| 301958 ||  || — || February 29, 2000 || Socorro || LINEAR || JUN || align=right | 1.4 km || 
|-id=959 bgcolor=#E9E9E9
| 301959 ||  || — || February 29, 2000 || Socorro || LINEAR || — || align=right | 1.4 km || 
|-id=960 bgcolor=#E9E9E9
| 301960 ||  || — || February 29, 2000 || Socorro || LINEAR || — || align=right | 1.7 km || 
|-id=961 bgcolor=#E9E9E9
| 301961 ||  || — || February 28, 2000 || Catalina || CSS || — || align=right | 2.4 km || 
|-id=962 bgcolor=#FA8072
| 301962 ||  || — || March 9, 2000 || Socorro || LINEAR || — || align=right | 3.2 km || 
|-id=963 bgcolor=#E9E9E9
| 301963 ||  || — || March 5, 2000 || Socorro || LINEAR || — || align=right | 2.2 km || 
|-id=964 bgcolor=#B88A00
| 301964 ||  || — || March 8, 2000 || Socorro || LINEAR || unusual || align=right | 11 km || 
|-id=965 bgcolor=#FA8072
| 301965 ||  || — || March 14, 2000 || Catalina || CSS || — || align=right | 2.3 km || 
|-id=966 bgcolor=#E9E9E9
| 301966 ||  || — || March 1, 2000 || Catalina || CSS || — || align=right | 1.7 km || 
|-id=967 bgcolor=#E9E9E9
| 301967 ||  || — || March 25, 2000 || Kitt Peak || Spacewatch || NEM || align=right | 2.8 km || 
|-id=968 bgcolor=#FA8072
| 301968 ||  || — || March 28, 2000 || Socorro || LINEAR || — || align=right | 4.5 km || 
|-id=969 bgcolor=#fefefe
| 301969 ||  || — || March 30, 2000 || Kitt Peak || Spacewatch || — || align=right data-sort-value="0.80" | 800 m || 
|-id=970 bgcolor=#E9E9E9
| 301970 ||  || — || April 5, 2000 || Socorro || LINEAR || JUN || align=right | 1.6 km || 
|-id=971 bgcolor=#E9E9E9
| 301971 ||  || — || April 5, 2000 || Socorro || LINEAR || EUN || align=right | 1.6 km || 
|-id=972 bgcolor=#E9E9E9
| 301972 ||  || — || April 7, 2000 || Anderson Mesa || LONEOS || JUN || align=right | 1.3 km || 
|-id=973 bgcolor=#fefefe
| 301973 ||  || — || April 5, 2000 || Anderson Mesa || LONEOS || — || align=right data-sort-value="0.88" | 880 m || 
|-id=974 bgcolor=#E9E9E9
| 301974 ||  || — || April 2, 2000 || Socorro || LINEAR || — || align=right | 2.0 km || 
|-id=975 bgcolor=#E9E9E9
| 301975 ||  || — || April 24, 2000 || Kitt Peak || Spacewatch || — || align=right | 3.0 km || 
|-id=976 bgcolor=#d6d6d6
| 301976 ||  || — || April 24, 2000 || Kitt Peak || Spacewatch || — || align=right | 2.5 km || 
|-id=977 bgcolor=#E9E9E9
| 301977 ||  || — || April 30, 2000 || Kitt Peak || Spacewatch || HEN || align=right | 1.4 km || 
|-id=978 bgcolor=#d6d6d6
| 301978 ||  || — || April 28, 2000 || Kitt Peak || Spacewatch || — || align=right | 2.9 km || 
|-id=979 bgcolor=#fefefe
| 301979 ||  || — || May 1, 2000 || Kitt Peak || Spacewatch || — || align=right data-sort-value="0.62" | 620 m || 
|-id=980 bgcolor=#fefefe
| 301980 ||  || — || May 6, 2000 || Socorro || LINEAR || PHO || align=right | 1.4 km || 
|-id=981 bgcolor=#fefefe
| 301981 ||  || — || May 6, 2000 || Socorro || LINEAR || — || align=right data-sort-value="0.92" | 920 m || 
|-id=982 bgcolor=#FA8072
| 301982 ||  || — || May 27, 2000 || Socorro || LINEAR || PHO || align=right | 1.3 km || 
|-id=983 bgcolor=#E9E9E9
| 301983 ||  || — || May 30, 2000 || Kitt Peak || Spacewatch || — || align=right | 2.1 km || 
|-id=984 bgcolor=#d6d6d6
| 301984 ||  || — || May 26, 2000 || Kitt Peak || Spacewatch || BRA || align=right | 2.3 km || 
|-id=985 bgcolor=#fefefe
| 301985 ||  || — || May 27, 2000 || Socorro || LINEAR || — || align=right | 1.0 km || 
|-id=986 bgcolor=#fefefe
| 301986 ||  || — || June 6, 2000 || Kitt Peak || Spacewatch || FLO || align=right data-sort-value="0.83" | 830 m || 
|-id=987 bgcolor=#fefefe
| 301987 || 2000 NS || — || July 3, 2000 || Prescott || P. G. Comba || NYS || align=right data-sort-value="0.79" | 790 m || 
|-id=988 bgcolor=#FA8072
| 301988 ||  || — || July 9, 2000 || Socorro || LINEAR || PHO || align=right | 1.9 km || 
|-id=989 bgcolor=#fefefe
| 301989 ||  || — || July 29, 2000 || Cerro Tololo || M. W. Buie || — || align=right | 1.2 km || 
|-id=990 bgcolor=#fefefe
| 301990 ||  || — || July 30, 2000 || Cerro Tololo || M. W. Buie || FLO || align=right data-sort-value="0.74" | 740 m || 
|-id=991 bgcolor=#FA8072
| 301991 ||  || — || August 1, 2000 || Socorro || LINEAR || — || align=right | 1.0 km || 
|-id=992 bgcolor=#fefefe
| 301992 ||  || — || August 24, 2000 || Socorro || LINEAR || V || align=right data-sort-value="0.89" | 890 m || 
|-id=993 bgcolor=#fefefe
| 301993 ||  || — || August 24, 2000 || Socorro || LINEAR || NYS || align=right data-sort-value="0.86" | 860 m || 
|-id=994 bgcolor=#d6d6d6
| 301994 ||  || — || August 24, 2000 || Socorro || LINEAR || — || align=right | 3.2 km || 
|-id=995 bgcolor=#fefefe
| 301995 ||  || — || August 25, 2000 || Socorro || LINEAR || — || align=right | 1.3 km || 
|-id=996 bgcolor=#fefefe
| 301996 ||  || — || August 25, 2000 || Socorro || LINEAR || FLO || align=right | 1.2 km || 
|-id=997 bgcolor=#fefefe
| 301997 ||  || — || August 29, 2000 || Socorro || LINEAR || NYS || align=right data-sort-value="0.72" | 720 m || 
|-id=998 bgcolor=#d6d6d6
| 301998 ||  || — || August 31, 2000 || Socorro || LINEAR || Tj (2.99) || align=right | 2.3 km || 
|-id=999 bgcolor=#fefefe
| 301999 ||  || — || August 31, 2000 || Socorro || LINEAR || V || align=right | 1.1 km || 
|-id=000 bgcolor=#fefefe
| 302000 ||  || — || August 31, 2000 || Socorro || LINEAR || — || align=right | 1.1 km || 
|}

References

External links 
 Discovery Circumstances: Numbered Minor Planets (300001)–(305000) (IAU Minor Planet Center)

0301